= Teuthrania =

Ancient Greek city in Anatolia

Coordinates: 39°02′07″N 27°03′17″E

- Location within Turkey
- Type: Settlement
- Cultures: Ancient Greek
- Location: İzmir, Turkey
- Region: Mysia

History
- Built: 3000 BC

Site notes
- Condition: In ruins

Teuthrania (Ancient Greek: Τευθρανία) was an Ancient Greek town in northwest Anatolia in the region of Mysia, and the name of its surrounding district on the river Caicus. It was near the powerful city and region of Pergamon. Tradition associated it with the legendary Mysian king Teuthras. According to Strabo, Teuthrania was situated between the Anatolian cities of Elaea, Pitane, and Atarneus.

Teuthrania featured in various ancient myths and historical traditions. Strabo wrote that Teuthras adopted a youth named Telephus as his son and successor. Telephus was a son of Heracles. (A character named Eurypylus, said to be a son of Telephus, appears in the Odyssey as the ruler of the Ceteii).

Herodotus wrote that the cities of Halisarna, Pergamon, and Teuthrania had been given by the Persian king Darius I to the Spartan king Demaratus in c. 486 BCE in exchange for Spartan military aid.

In the Anabasis, Xenophon wrote that under the command of Procles, son of Demaratus, Teuthrania attacked Pergamon. In the Hellenica, Xenophon relates that Teuthrania, Pergamum, Halisarna, Gambrium, Palaegambrium, Myrina and Gryneium were delivered by their rulers to the army of the Spartan Thimbron around the year 399 BCE, who sought to liberate the Greek colonies from Persian rule.

According to the 7th-century BCE epic poem called Cypria, now a lost literary work, Teuthrania was mistaken for Troy in the Achaeans' first expedition.
