= Prokles (Pergamon) =

Ruler of the cities of Pergamon, Teuthrania and Halisarna (c. 400 BC)

- Prokles
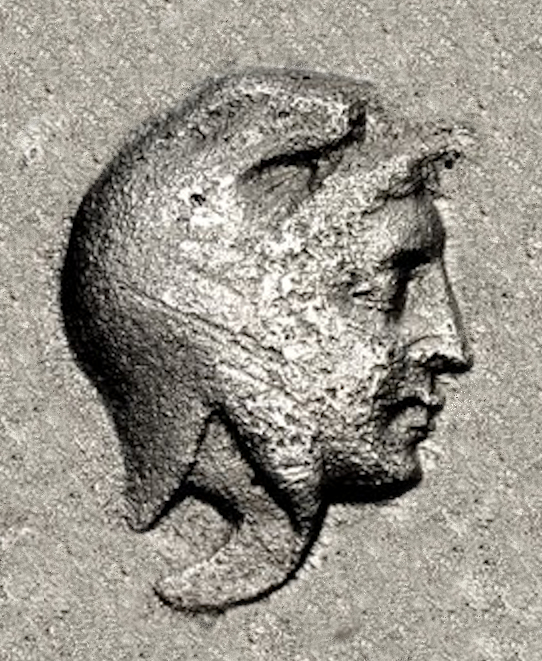
- Portrait of Prokles, from his coinage, circa 400 BC
- Military career
- Allegiance: Achaemenid Empire
- Rank: Governor

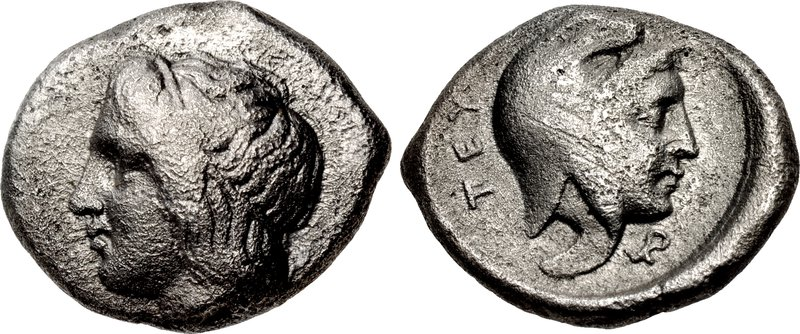
Coin of Prokles, brother and co-ruler of Eurysthenes, as Dynast of Teuthrania and Halisarna, circa 400-399 BC. Obv: Head of Apollo. Rev: Portrait of Prokles wearing the Persian cap. Letters ΤΕΥ ("TEU", for Teuthrania). Teuthrania, Mysia. Laureate head of Apollo left / Head of Prokles right, wearing Persian headdress.

Location of Pergamon.

Prokles (circa 400 BC) was a descendant of the exiled Spartan king Demaratus, and ruler of Pergamon in Asia Minor under the Achaemenid Empire. He was a brother of Eurysthenes, with whom he was a joint ruler.

After his deposition in 491 BC Demaratus had fled to Persia, where king Darius I made him ruler of the cities of Pergamon, Teuthrania and Halisarna. About a hundred years later Eurysthenes and his brother Prokles reigned over the same cities; their joint rule is at least attested for the year 399 BC.

Xenophon and the Ten Thousand received some support from Prokles in facing Achaemenid troops, at the beginning of their campaign into Asia Minor. According to Xenophon (Anabasis, 7.8.8-17), when he arrived in Mysia in 399, he met Hellas, the widow of Gongylos and probably daughter of Themistocles, who was living at Pergamon. His two sons, Gorgion and Gongylos the younger, ruled respectively over the cities of Gambrium, Palaegambrium for Gorgion, and Myrina and Grynium for Gongylos. Xenophon received some support from the descendants of Gongylos for his campaign into Asia Minor, as well as from the descendants of Demaratos, a Spartan exile who also had become a satrap for the Achaemenids, in the person of his descendant Prokles.

The coinage of Prokles displays one of the earliest portraits of a Greek ruler on a coin.

The city of Pergamon was later taken over by the Spartan general Thibron, who was fighting against the Achaemenid Satrap of Lydia and Ionia Tissaphernes.
