= Halisarna =

Town of ancient Mysia

Coordinates: 39°02′42″N 27°06′54″E

Halisarna (Ancient Greek: Ἁλίσαρνα) was a town of ancient Mysia on the north bank of the river Caïcus. The nearby towns of Halisarna, Pergamum, and Teuthrania had been given by the Persian king Darius I to the Spartan king Demaratus about the year 486 BCE for his help in the expedition against Greece. Demaratus's descendants continued to rule these cities at the beginning of the 4th century BCE. During the withdrawal of Pergamum from The March of the Ten Thousand, it was attacked by, among others, troops from Halisarna and Teuthrania under command of Procles, son of Demaratus. In the Hellenica, Xenophon relates that Halisarna, together with Pergamum, Teuthrania, Gambrium, Palaegambrium, Myrina and Gryneium were delivered by their rulers to the army that, under the command of the Spartan Thimbron, around the year 399 BCE, had come to the area to try to liberate the Greek colonies from the Persian domain.

Its site is located near modern Eğrigöltepe, in Asiatic Turkey.
