= Yenişakran =

- Neighbourhood
- Location in Turkey Yenişakran (İzmir)
- Coordinates: 38°53′N 27°04′E
- Country: Turkey
- Province: İzmir
- District: Aliağa
- Elevation: 15 m (49 ft)
- Population (2022): 5,766
- Time zone: UTC+3 (TRT)
- Postal code: 35800
- Area code: 0232

Yenişakran is a neighbourhood in the municipality and district of Aliağa, İzmir Province, Turkey. Its population is 5,766 (2022). Before the 2013 reorganisation, it was a town (belde). It is situated at a bay of the Aegean Sea. It is on the state highway D.550. The distance to Aliağa is 14 kilometres (8.7 mi) and to İzmir is 75 kilometres (47 mi).

== History ==
Although Yenişakran is founded only recently the vicinity of the town is rich in historical ruins. There are at least three sites of ancient settlements to the south of yenişakran, Ancient Kyme is in Aliağa. Another site Myrina which was founded by Tezeus in the 11th century BC is to on the way connecting Yenişakran to Aliağa and Gryneion is just at the south of Yenişakran. The ruins to the north of the town may even be more ancient. At the north of the town there are ruins which were believed to belong to Elaia.The famous Pergamon is in Bergama about 30 kilometres (19 mi) north of Yenişakran. However, in contrast to historical ruins Yenişakran is relatively a recent town. The very first settlement began in 1949 and Yenişakran gained the status of village in 1955. After the rapid growth in population in 1982 Yenişakran was declared a township.

== Economy ==
The main agricultural wealth is olive. Fruit production and cattle breeding are other important economic activities. Tourism is also an important sector. Being relatively near to big city of İzmir Yenişakran hosts summer house vacationists.
