= Eurysthenes (Pergamon) =

Ruler of the cities of Pergamon, Teuthrania and Halisarna (c.400 BC)

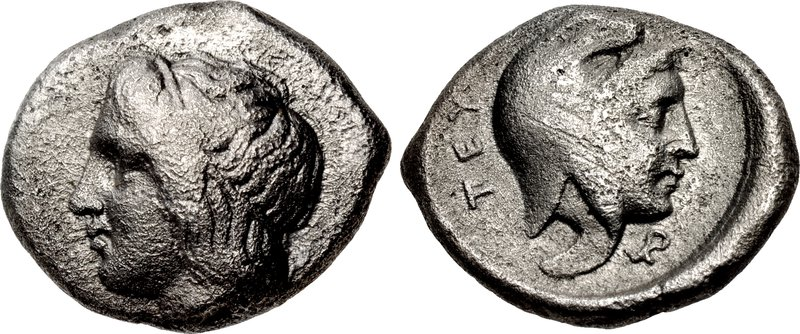
Coin of Prokles, brother and co-ruler of Eurysthenes, as Dynast of Teuthrania and Halisarna, circa 400-399 BC. Obv: Head of Apollo. Rev: Portrait of Prokles wearing the Persian cap. Letters ΤΕΥ ("TEU", for Teuthrania). Teuthrania, Mysia. Laureate head of Apollo left / Head of Prokles right, wearing Persian headdress.

Location of Pergamon.

Eurysthenes (Greek: Εὐρυσθένης; c. 400 BC) was a descendant of the Spartan king Demaratus.

After his deposition in 491 BC, Demaratus had fled to Persia, where king Darius I made him ruler of the cities of Pergamon, Teuthrania and Halisarna. About a hundred years later Eurysthenes and his brother Procles reigned over the same cities; their joint rule is at least attested for the year 399 BC.
