= Telephus =

Son of Heracles in Greek mythology

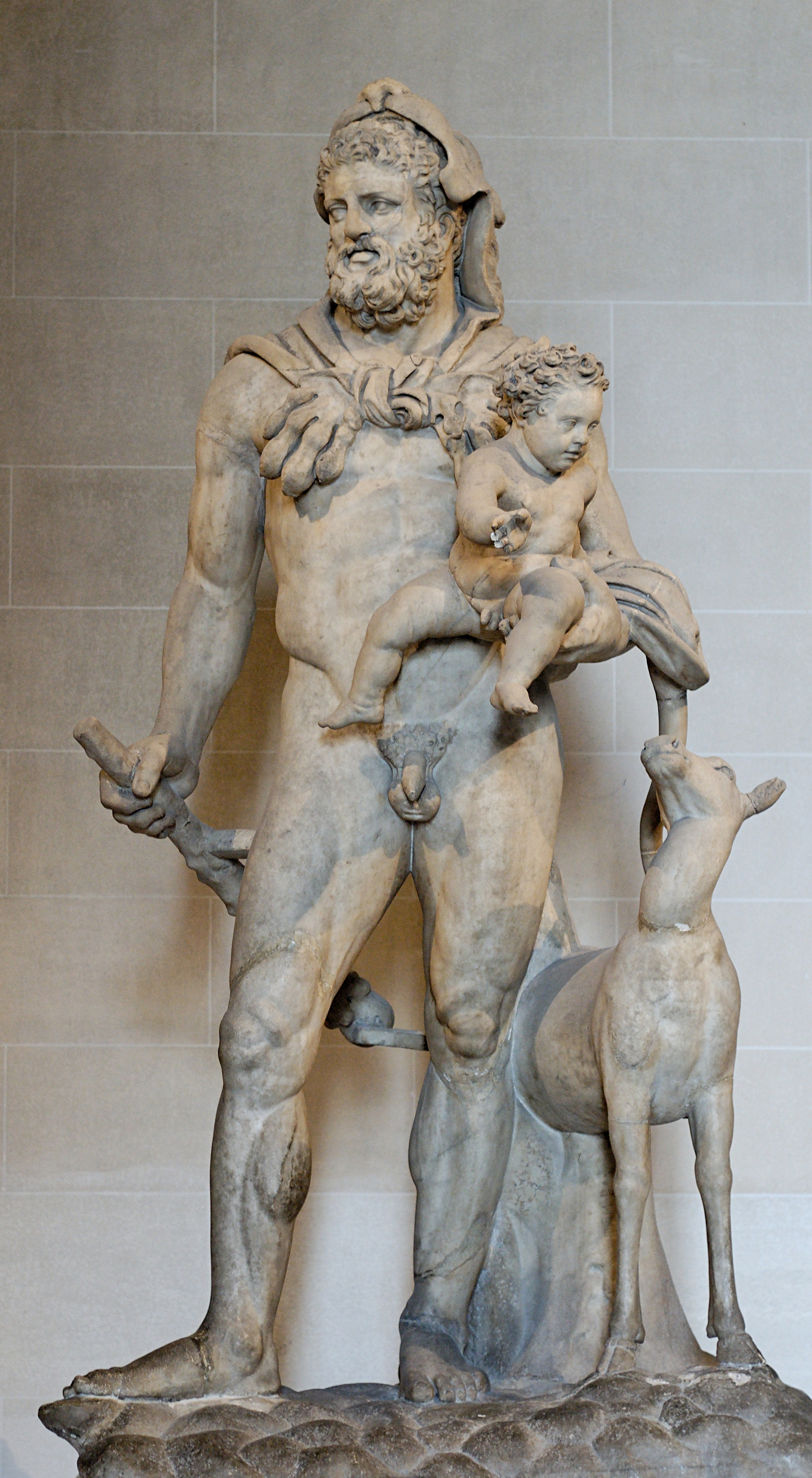
Heracles with the infant Telephus and deer, mid second century AD. Paris, Louvre MA 75.

In Greek mythology, Telephus (/ˈtɛlɪfəs/; Ancient Greek: Τήλεφος, romanized: Tēlephos, lit. 'far-shining') was the son of Heracles and Auge, who was the daughter of king Aleus of Tegea. He was adopted by Teuthras, the king of Mysia, in Asia Minor, whom he succeeded as king. Telephus was wounded by Achilles when the Achaeans came to his kingdom on their way to sack Troy and bring Helen back to Sparta, and later healed by Achilles. He was the father of Eurypylus, who fought alongside the Trojans against the Greeks in the Trojan War. Telephus' story was popular in ancient Greek and Roman iconography and tragedy. Telephus' name and mythology were possibly derived from the Hittite god Telepinu.

== Birth to adulthood ==
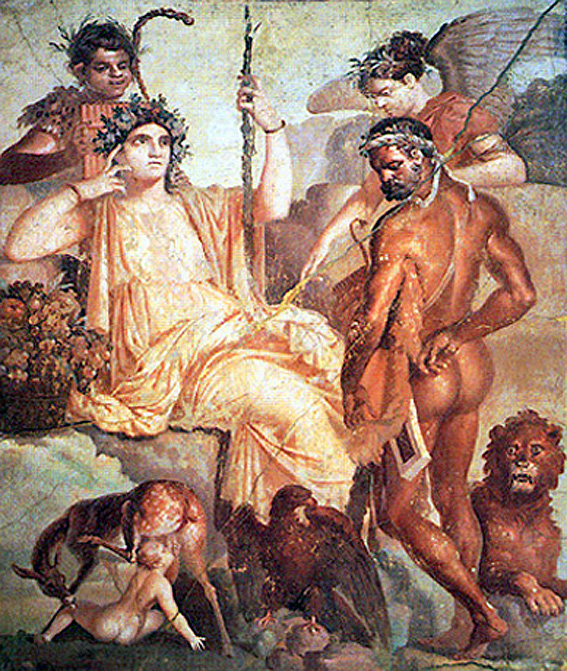
Heracles finds Telephus suckled by a deer, with Arkadia, Pan and a winged Virgo looking on, first century AD. Naples, National Archaeological Museum 9008.

=== Summary ===
Telephus' mother was Auge, the daughter of Aleus, the king of Tegea, a city in Arcadia, in the Peloponnese of mainland Greece. His father was Heracles, who had seduced or raped Auge, a priestess of Athena. When Aleus found out, he tried to dispose of mother and child, but eventually both ended up in Asia Minor at the court of Teuthras, king of Mysia, where Telephus was adopted as the childless king's heir.

There were three versions of how Telephus, the son of an Arcadian princess, came to be the heir of a Mysian king. In the oldest extant account, Auge goes to Mysia, is raised as a daughter by Teuthras, and Telephus is born there. In some accounts Telephus arrives in Mysia as an infant with his mother, where Teuthras marries Auge, and adopts Telephus. In others, while Auge (in various ways) is delivered to the Mysian court where she again becomes wife to the king, Telephus is instead left behind in Arcadia, having been abandoned on Mount Parthenion, either by Aleus or by Auge when she gave birth while being taken to the sea by Nauplius to be drowned. The infant Telephus is suckled by a deer until he is found and raised by either King Corythus or his herdsmen. Seeking knowledge of his mother, Telephus consults the Delphic oracle which directs him to Mysia, where he is reunited with Auge and adopted by Teuthras.

=== Sources ===
A surviving fragment of the Hesiodic Catalogue of Women (sixth century BC), representing perhaps the oldest tradition, places Telephus' birth in Mysia. In this telling Telephus' mother Auge had been received at the court of Teuthras in Mysia (possibly at the command of the gods) and raised by him as a daughter. And it is in Mysia that Heracles, while seeking the horses of Laomedon, fathers Telephus.

All other surviving sources have Telephus born in Arcadia. The oldest such account (c. 490–480 BC), by the historian and geographer Hecataeus, says that Heracles used to have sex with Auge whenever he came to Tegea. We are told this by the second-century traveler Pausanias, who goes on to say, perhaps drawing upon Hecataeus, that when Aleus discovered that Auge had given birth to Telephus, he had mother and child shut up in a wooden chest and cast adrift on the open sea. The chest made its way from Arcadia to the Caicus river plain in Asia Minor, where the local king Teuthras married Auge.

Sophocles, in the fifth century BC, wrote a tragedy Aleadae (The sons of Aleus), which apparently told the circumstances of Telephus' birth. The play is lost and only fragments now remain, but a declamation attributed to the fourth-century BC orator Alcidamas probably used Sophocles' Aleadae for one of its sources. According to Alcidamas, Auge's father Aleus had been warned by the Delphic oracle that if Auge had a son, then this grandson would kill Aleus' sons, so Aleus made Auge a priestess of Athena, telling her she must remain a virgin, on pain of death. But Heracles passing through Tegea, being entertained by Aleus in the temple of Athena, became enamored of Auge and, while drunk, had sex with her. Aleus discovered that Auge was pregnant and gave her to Nauplius to be drowned. But, on the way to the sea, Auge gave birth to Telephus on Mount Parthenion, and according to Alcidamas, Nauplius, ignoring his orders, sold mother and child to the childless Mysian king Teuthras, who married Auge and adopted Telephus, and "later gave him to Priam to be educated at Troy". Alcidamas' version of the story must have diverged from Sophocles in at least this last respect. For, rather than the infant Telephus being sold to Teuthras, as in Alcidamas, an Aleadae fragment seems to insure that in the Sophoclean play, as in many later accounts (see above), the new-born Telephus was instead abandoned (on Mount Parthenion?), where he is suckled by a deer.

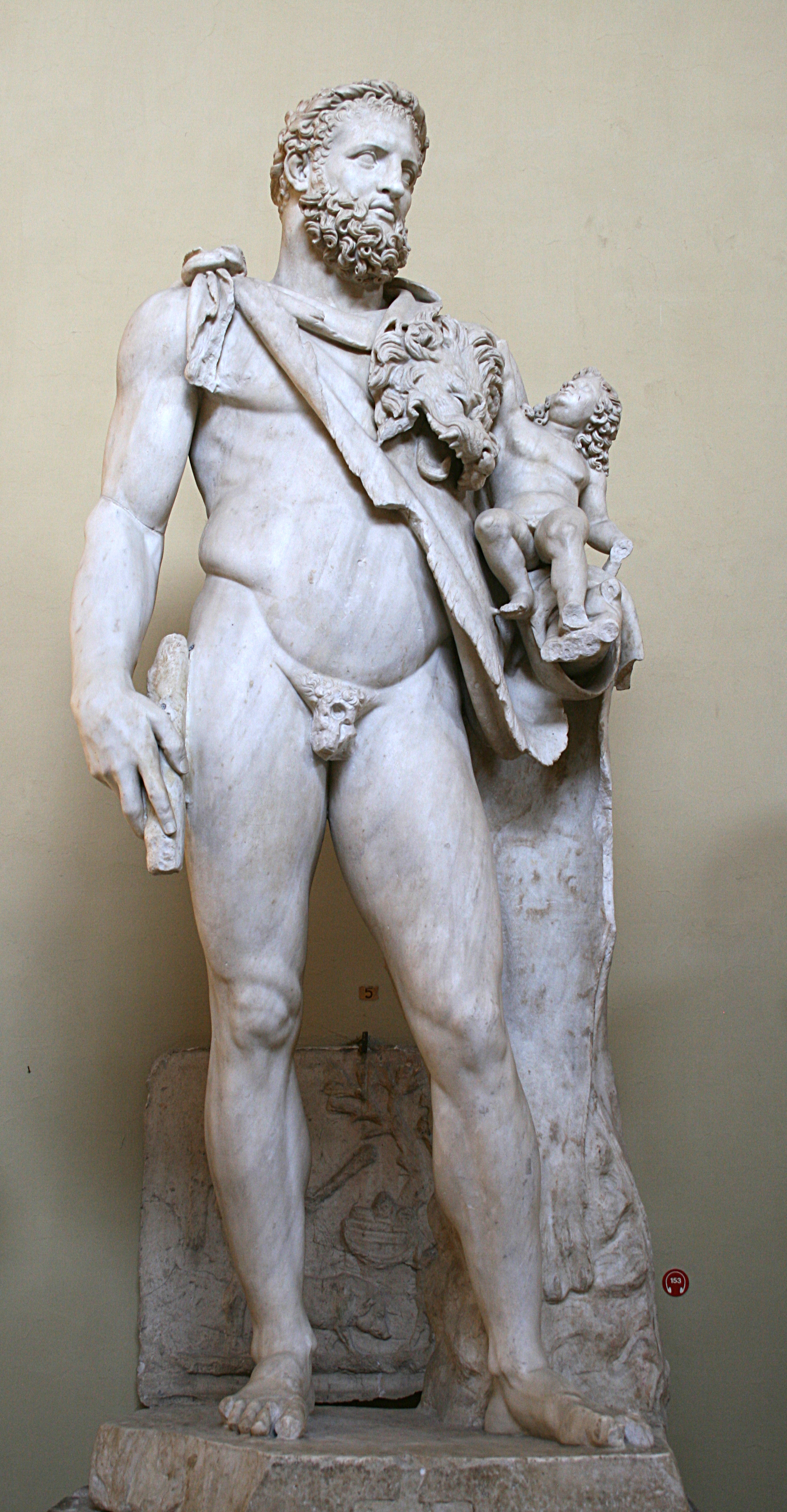
Marble statue of Hercules holding baby Telephus in his arms. Ancient Roman copy from a Greek original of 4th century BC. Found in the 16th century in Campo de' Fiori in Rome. Museo Chiaramonti, the Vatican

Euripides wrote a play Auge (408 BC?) which also dealt with Telephus' birth. The play is lost, but a summary of the plot can be pieced together from various later sources, in particular a narrative summary given by the Armenian historian Moses of Chorene. A drunken Heracles, during a festival of Athena, rapes "Athena's priestess Auge, daughter of Aleus, as she conducted the dances during the nocturnal rites." Auge gives birth secretly in Athena's temple at Tegea, and hides the new-born Telephus there. The child is discovered, and Aleus orders Telephus exposed and Auge drowned, but Heracles returns and apparently saves the pair from imminent death. The play perhaps ended with the assurance (from Athena to Heracles?) that Auge and Telephus would be wife and son to Teuthras.

Strabo gives a version of the story similar to Pausanias', saying that, after discovering "her ruin by Heracles", Aleus put Auge and Telephus into a chest and cast it into the sea, that it washed up at the mouth of the Caicus, and that Teuthras married Auge, and adopted Telephus.

Later accounts by the first-century BC Historian Diodorus Siculus and the 1st or second-century AD mythographer Apollodorus provide additional details and variations. Diodorus, as in Alcidamas' account, says that Aleus gave the pregnant Auge to Nauplius to be drowned, that she gave birth to Telephus near Mount Parthenion, and that she ended up with Teuthras in Mysia. But in Diodorus' account, instead of being sold, along with his mother, to Teuthras, Telephus is abandoned by Auge "in some bushes", where he is suckled by a doe and found by herdsmen. They give him to their King Corythus, who raises Telephus as his son. When Telephus grows up, wishing to find his mother, he consults the oracle at Delphi, which sends him to king Teuthras in Mysia. There he finds Auge and, as before, is adopted by the childless king and made his heir. Apollodorus, as in Euripides' Auge, says that Auge delivered Telephus secretly in Athena's temple, and hid him there. Apollodorus adds that an ensuing famine, was declared by an oracle to be the result of some impiety in the temple, and a search of the temple caused Telephus to be found. Aleus had Telephus exposed on Parthenion, where as in Sophocles' Aleadae, he is suckled by a doe. According to Apollodorus, he was found and raised by herdsman. As in Diodorus' account, Telephus consults the oracle at Delphi, is sent to Mysia, where he becomes the adopted heir of Teuthras.

According to the mythographer Hyginus (whose account is apparently taken from an older tragic source, probably Sophocles' Mysians), after Auge abandoned Telephus on Mount Parthenion she fled to Mysia where, as in the Catalogue of Women, she became the adopted daughter (not wife) of Teuthras. When Telephus goes to Mysia on the instruction of the oracle, Teuthras promises him his kingdom and his daughter Auge in marriage if he would defeat his enemy Idas. This Telephus did, with the help of Parthenopeus, a childhood companion who had been found as a baby on Mount Parthenion at the same time as Telephus, and was raised together with him. Teuthras then gave Auge to Telephus, but Auge, still faithful to Heracles, attacked Telephus with a sword in their wedding chamber, but the gods intervened sending a serpent to separate them, causing Auge to drop her sword. Just as Telephus was about to kill Auge, she called out to Heracles for rescue and Telephus then recognized his mother.

== The silence of Telephus ==
Presumably Sophocles' Aleadae (The Sons of Aleus) told how Telephus, while still in Arcadia, prior to going to Mysia in search of his mother, killed Aleus' sons, thereby fulfilling the oracle. Ancient sources confirm the killing, however virtually nothing is known of how this may have come about.

The murder of his uncles would have caused Telephus to become religiously polluted, and in need of purification, and apparently, Greek religious practice required criminal homicides to remain silent until their blood-guilt could be expiated. Aristotle in the Poetics, in a reference to Telephus' appearance in some play he calls the Mysians, mentions "the man who came from Tegea to Mysia without speaking". And indeed, the silence of Telephus was apparently "proverbial". The comic poet Alexis writes about a voracious dinner guest who like "Telephus in speechless silence sits, / Making but signs to those who ask him questions", presumably too intent on eating to converse. And another comic poet Amphis, complains about fishmongers who "mute they stand like Telephus", going on to say that the comparison of the fishmongers to Telephus is apt since "they all are homicides".

== King in Mysia ==
=== Summary ===
==== Attacked by the Greeks ====
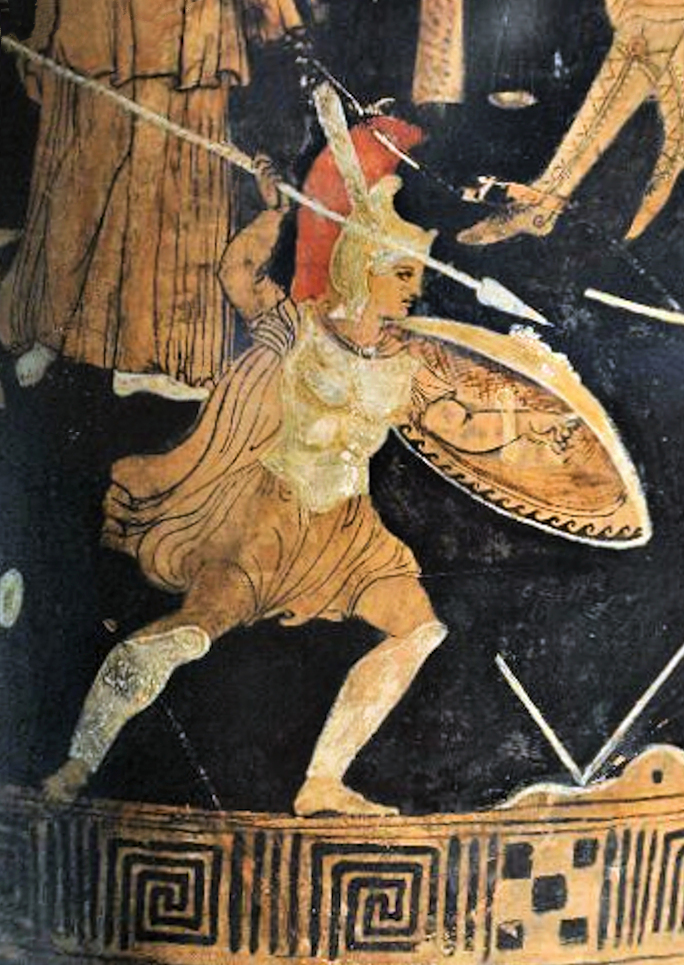
Achilles; ancient Greek polychromatic pottery painting (dating to c. 300 BC)

Telephus was made the heir of Teuthras' kingdom of Teuthrania in Mysia, and eventually succeeded Teuthras as its king. During Telephus' reign, in a prelude to the Trojan War, the Greeks attacked Telephus' city mistaking it for Troy. Telephus routed the Greeks, killing Thersander, son of Polynices, and forcing the Greeks back to their ships.

But Telephus was tripped by a vine and wounded in the thigh by Achilles' spear. According to Apollodorus, and a scholiast on Homer's Iliad, Telephus was tripped while fleeing from Achilles' attack. The scholiast says that Dionysus caused the vine to trip Telephus because Telephus had failed to properly honor him. Dionysus' involvement is attested by a late sixth-century or early fifth-century BC red-figure calyx krater. Philostratus and Dictys Cretensis give detailed elaborations of all these events.

==== Wound and healing ====
The Mysians were victorious, and the Greeks returned home, but Telephus' wound would not heal. Telephus consulted the oracle of Apollo which gave the famous reply ὁ τρώσας ἰάσεται ("your assailant will heal you"). So Telephus went to Argos to seek a cure, and was healed there by Achilles. In return Telephus agreed to guide the Greeks to Troy. Apollodorus and Hyginus tell us that rust scraped from Achilles' spear was the healing agent. The healing of Telephus was a frequent theme in Augustan age and later Roman poetry. The Pharmacologia of John Ayrton Paris identifies verdigris, which has medicinal properties, as the healing rust of the spear.

=== Sources ===
There is no mention of the battle in Mysia in the Iliad or the Odyssey. However, the Cypria (late seventh century BC?), one of the poems of the Epic Cycle, told the story. According to Proclus' summary of the Cypria, the Greeks mistook Mysia for Troy, Telephus killed Thersander, but was wounded by Achilles. Telephus, guided by an oracle, came to Argos, where Achilles cured him in return for Telephus guiding the Greeks to Troy. Pindar (c. 522–443 BC), knew the story of Telephus' wounding by Achilles, presumably after being tripped by a vine: "Achilles, who stained the vine-covered plain of Mysia, spattering it with the dark blood of Telephus".

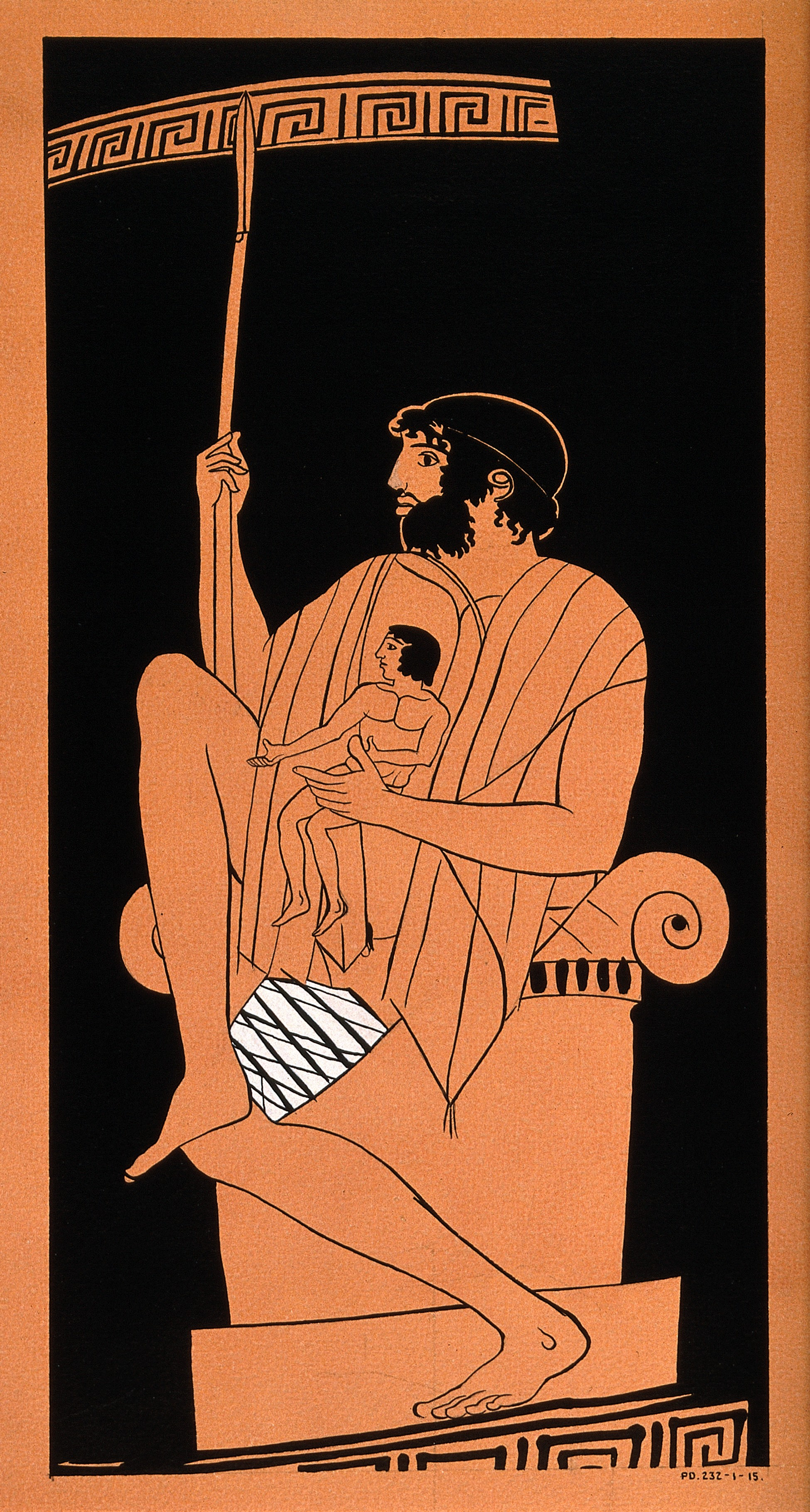
Telephus seated on altar, with bandaged thigh, holding a spear and the infant Orestes. Detail from an Athenian red-figure pelike, c. 450 BC, British Museum E 382.

Each of the three tragedians, Aeschylus, Sophocles, and Euripides wrote plays, all now lost, telling Telephus' story. Euripides' play Telephus (438 BC), dramatized Telephus' trip to Argos seeking a cure for his festering wound. In Euripides' account, Telephus disguised himself as a beggar dressed in rags. After his disguise was revealed, Telephus seized the Greek king Agamemnon's infant son Orestes to use as a hostage. But it was discovered that Telephus was a Greek by birth, and Telephus agreed to guide the Greek army to Troy, in return for Achilles' healing his wound. Orestes being held hostage by Telephus was already being illustrated on red-figure pottery possibly as early as the second quarter of the fifth century, and the scene perhaps also appeared previously in Aeschylus' presentation of the story.

An Etruscan mirror, from the second half of the fourth century BC (Berlin, Antikensammlung Fr. 35) and a bas-relief (c. first century BC) from Herculaneum (Naples, National Archaeological Museum 6591) are interpreted as depicting Achilles healing Telephus with rust from his spear. Pliny the Elder (first-century AD) describes paintings (undated) which depicted Achilles scraping rust from his spear into the wound of Telephus. One such painting was perhaps attributed by tradition to the fifth-century BC Athenian painter Parrhasius. The first literary references to the use of rust scraped from Achilles' spear as the healing agent for Telephus' wound are found in the first-century BC Roman poets Propertius and Ovid.

Apollodorus gives a version of the Mysian expedition, probably drawn directly from the Cypria. Apollodorus' account agrees with Proclus' summary, but gives more of the story. Telephus killed many Greeks in addition to Thersander, but was tripped by a vine while fleeing from Achilles. Apollo told Telephus that his wound "would be cured when the one who wounded him should turn physician". So Telephus went to Argos "clad in rags" (as in Euripides' Telephus) and, promising to guide the Greeks to Troy, begged Achilles to cure him, which Achilles did by using rust scraped from his spear. Telephus then showed the Greeks the way to Troy. The A scholia on Iliad 1.59, agrees with Proclus' and Apollodorus' accounts, but attributes the vine-tripping to Dionysus, angry because of unpaid honors, and adds that in addition to leading the Greeks to Troy, Telephus also agreed not to aid the Trojans in the coming war.

Hyginus' account seems to be based, in part at least, on one or more of the tragedians' lost plays. Hyginus tells of the wound inflicted by Achilles' spear, the wound's festering, and Telephus' consulting of the Apollo's oracle, with the answer that "the only thing that could cure him was the very same spear by which he had been wounded." So Telephus sought out Agamemnon, and on the advice of Agamemnon's wife Clytemnestra, Telephus snatched their infant son Orestes from his cradle, and threatened to kill the child unless his wound was healed. As the Greeks had also received an oracle saying that they would not be able to take Troy without Telephus' aid, they asked Achilles to heal Telephus. When Achilles protested he did not know anything about medicine, Odysseus pointed out that Apollo did not mean Achilles, but that the spear itself would be the cure. So they scraped rust from the spear into the wound, and Telephus was cured. The Greeks then asked Telephus to join them in sacking Troy, but Telephus refused because his wife Laodice was the daughter of Priam, the king of Troy. However, Telephus did promise to be the Greeks' guide to Troy.

== Wives and offspring ==
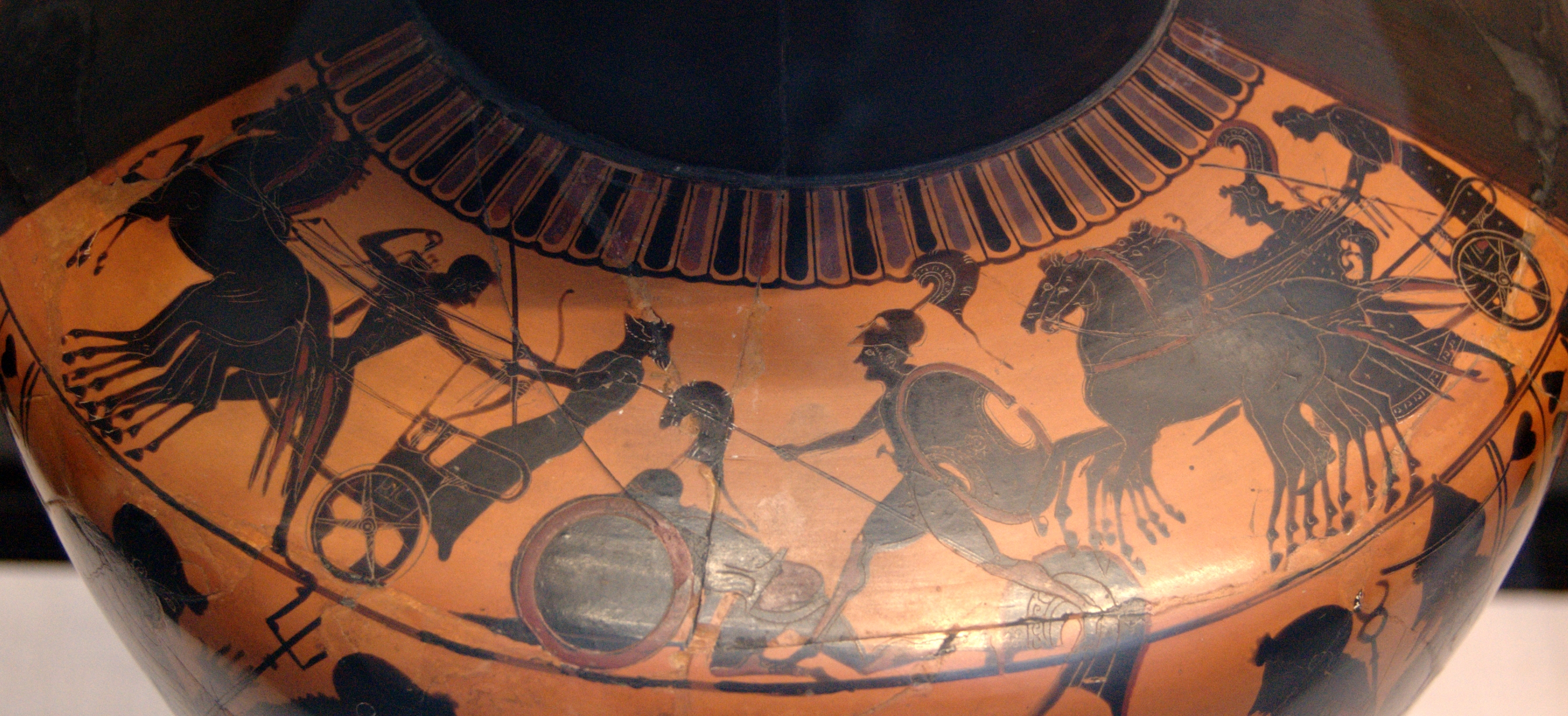
Neoptolemus killing Eurypylus Attica black-figure hydria by the Antimenes Painter, 550–500 BC, Martin von Wagner Museum L 309.

The earliest mention of Telephus, which occurs in Homer's Odyssey (c. eighth century BC), says that Telephus had a son Eurypylus, who died at Troy. Nothing is said there about who Eurypylus' mother was, but all ancient sources that do mention Eurypylus' mother say that she was Astyoche, who was (usually) Priam's sister. Eurypylus led a large force of Mysians to fight on the side of Troy during the final stages of the Trojan War. Eurypylus was a great warrior, and killed many opponents, including Machaon and Nireus, but was finally killed by Achilles' son Neoptolemus. The irony of Achilles' son killing Telephus' son using the same spear that Achilles had used to both wound and heal Telephus, apparently figured in Sophocles' lost play Eurypylus. According to Servius, Eurypylus had a son, Grynus, who became king in Mysia and was known as the eponym of Gryneion and the founder of Pergamon. Another son of Telephus, according to Servius was Cyparissus, who later became one of Apollo's male lovers.

Three other wives are given for Telephus, with no mention of offspring. According to Hyginus (as mentioned above) Telephus' wife was Priam's daughter Laodice. According to Diodorus Siculus, Telephus married Agriope a daughter of Teuthras. While Philostratus says that Hiera, the leader of a contingent of Mysian women cavalry, killed in battle by Nireus, was the wife of Telephus. The Amazon-like Hiera had already been portrayed, on horseback, leading the Mysian women into battle, on the second-century BC Telephus frieze of the Pergamon Altar.

Three other offspring of Telephus are given which link Telephus with Italian myths. In Lycophron's Alexandra, the legendary founders of the Etruscan Dodecapolis, Tarchon and Tyrensus (also spelled Tyrrhenus) are the sons of Telephus. That Tyrrhenus was said to be the son of Telephus is also reported by Dionysius of Halicarnassus. Neither Lycophron nor Dionysius mention the name of their mother, although apparently according to some, their mother was Hiera. Plutarch says that, according to one account, Telephus was the father of a daughter, Roma, from whom the city of Rome took its name. Meanwhile, Byzantine writer Malalas calls Latinus, who is otherwise a son of Faunus or Hercules, a son of Telephus.

== Iconography ==
Over a hundred entries for Telephus are cataloged in the Lexicon Iconographicum Mythologiae Classicae (LIMC). Most representations associated with Telephus are late, with only a few earlier than the fourth century BC. Early examples include Attic red-figure pottery from as early as c. 510 BC, and East-Ionian engraved gems (c. 480 BC). Scenes showing Telephus suckled by a deer or holding Orestes hostage were particularly popular. Other scenes include either his wounding or his healing by Achilles. The most complete single account of the life of Telephus is depicted in the first-century BC Telephus frieze.

=== Telephus frieze ===
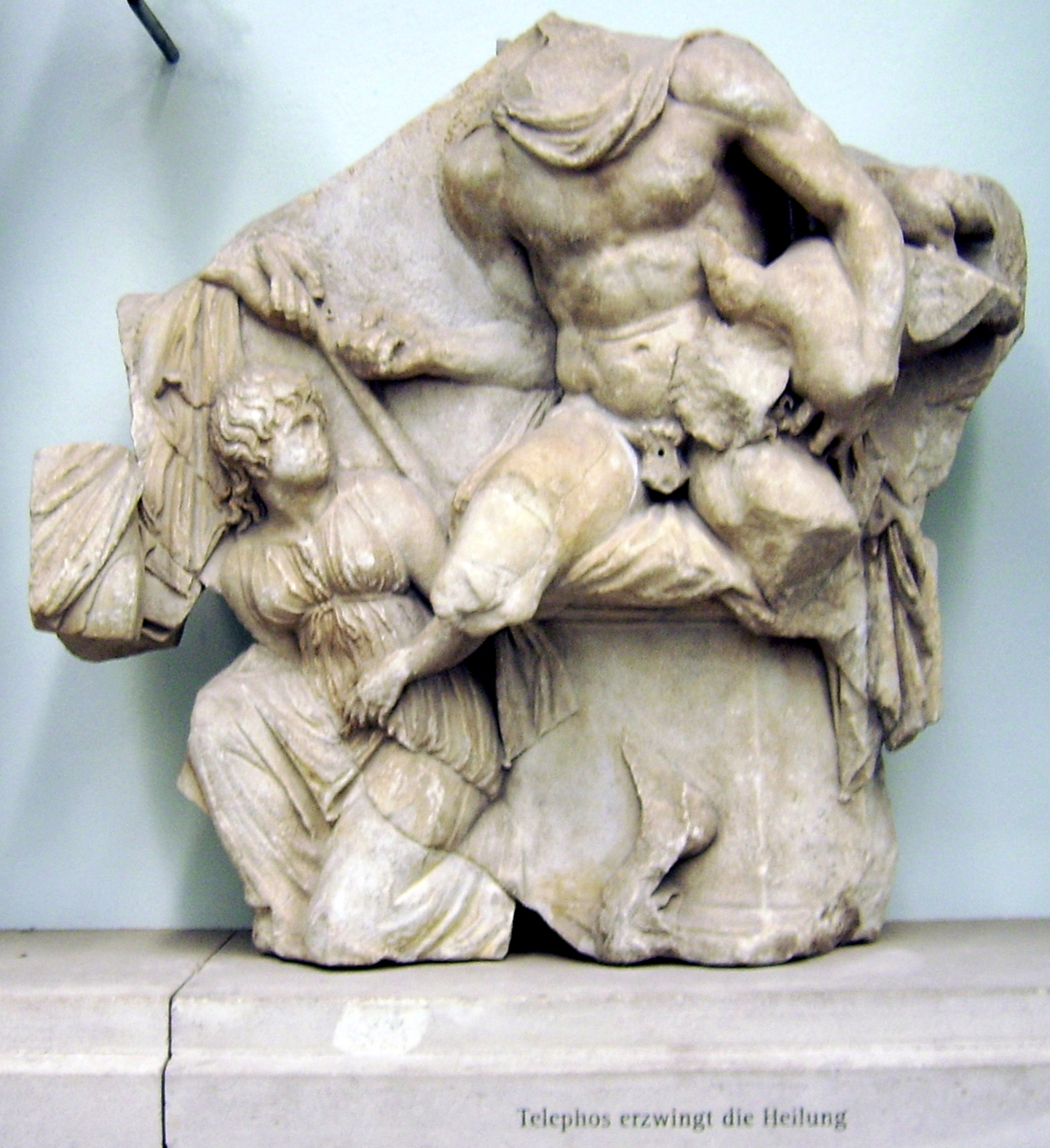
Telephus threatens the infant Orestes, at Agamemnon's altar. Telephus frieze (panel 42), second century BC. Berlin, Antikensammlung T.I.71 and 72.

The Telephus frieze (between 180 and 156 BC) formed part of the decoration of the Pergamon Altar. The frieze adorned the inside walls of the colonnade that surrounded the raised interior court containing the sacrificial altar. It was nearly 60 meters in length, and was composed of around 74 marble panels each 1.58 meters high, of which 47 panels are completely or partially preserved.

The panels depict scenes from the life of Telephus, from events preceding his birth, to perhaps his death and heroizing. Panels have been interpreted as showing Heracles' first glimpse of Auge in an oak grove (panel 3); carpenters building the vessel in which Auge will be cast into the sea (panels 5–6); Teuthras finding Auge on the shore in Mysia (panel 10); Heracles discovering the abandoned Telephus being suckled by a lioness (panel 12); Telephus receiving arms from Auge, and leaving for the war against Idas (panels 16–18); Teuthras giving Auge to Telephus in marriage (panel 20); and Auge and Telephus, being startled by a serpent, and recognizing each other on their wedding night (panel 21). The next several panels have been interpreted as depicting the battle between the Mysians and the Greeks on the Caicus plain, including Hiera, Telephus' Amazon-like wife, leading a group of Mysian women cavalry into battle (panels 22–24) and Achilles, aided by Dionysus, wounding Telephus (panels 30–31). Scenes follow which have been interpreted as showing Telephus consulting the oracle of Apollo regarding the healing of his wound (panel 1); Telephus arriving at Argos, seeking a cure for his wound (panels 34–35); his welcome there (panels 36–38); a banquet at Argos during which Telephus' identity is revealed (panels 39–40); Telephus threatening the infant Orestes at an altar (panel 42); and presumably his healing by Achilles. Two final panels perhaps depict Telephus' death and heroizing (panels 47–48).

=== Suckled by a deer ===
The abandoned Telephus being suckled by a deer was a frequent iconographic motif. Except for the Telephus frieze, which depicts the abandoned Telephus being suckled by a lioness, every other depiction of this event shows Telephus suckled by a deer. The earliest such representations occur on East-Ionian engraved gems (c. 480 BC), depicting the infant Telephus keeling or crawling under a standing deer, grasping the deer's teats. Nearly identical scenes appears on Tegeatic coins from about 370 BC. Pausanias reports seeing an image of Telephus suckled by a deer on Mount Helicon in Boeotia. Representations showing Heracles finding Telephus with a deer are also frequent from the first century AD. The scene continued to be popular through the third century AD.

=== Wounded by Achilles ===
A late sixth-century or early fifth-century Attic fragmentary red-figure calyx krater, attributed to Phintias (St. Petersburg, State Hermitage Museum ST1275) apparently depicted the battle between Telephus and Achilles. Fragments show Patroclus, and a bent over Diomedes (both named), part of a thyrsos, and the inscription "Dionysos". It is presumed that Diomedes is attending to the fallen Thersander, and that the central part of the vase depicted Achilles wounding Telephus, with the aid of the god Dionysus.

According to Pausanias, the battle between the Telephus and Achilles at the Caicus river was also depicted on the West pediment of the Temple of Athena Alea at Tegea (finished c. 350–340 BC). Only fragments remain of the West pediment, which indicate that Telephus perhaps wore the lion-skin of his father Heracles. Inscriptions show that Telephus and Auge were represented on the metopes of the temple, and Pausanias also mentions seeing a portrait painting of Auge there.

=== At Agamemnon's altar ===
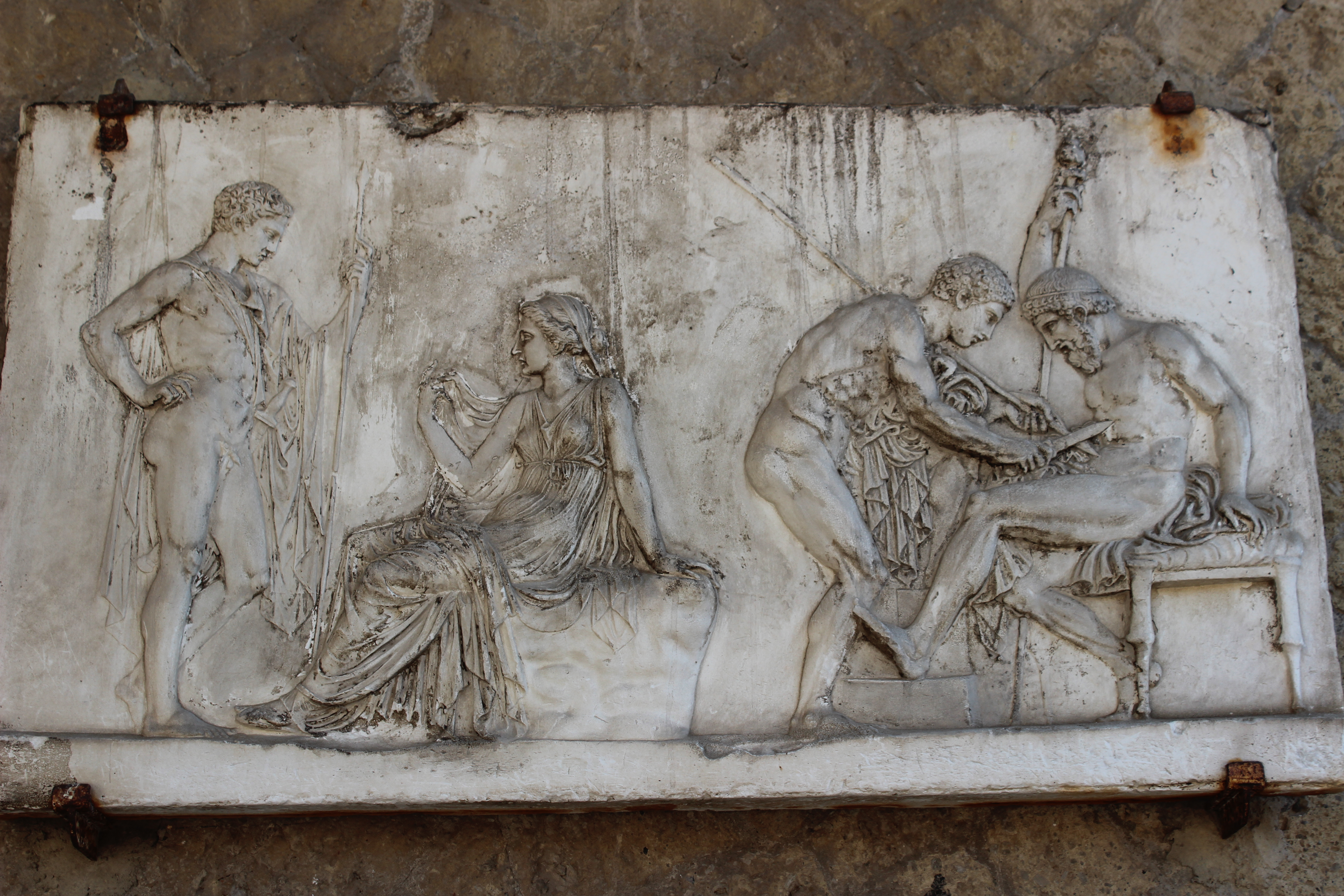
Achilles (right) scrapes rust from his spear on the wound of the seated Telephus, c. first century BC. Marble bas-relief, from the House of the Relief of Telephus, Herculaneum, Naples, National Archaeological Museum 6591.

Telephus' taking refuge at Agamemnon's altar, usually with Orestes as hostage, was also a frequent motif. Attic vase painting depicts the scene, often with either Agamemnon, or Clytemnestra, also present. Perhaps the earliest example, an Attic kylix cup (c. 470 BC) from Eastern Etruria (MFA 98.931) shows Telephus, with bandaged thigh, sitting alone on an altar holding two spears. An Attic pelike (c. 450 BC), from Vulci (British Museum E 382) shows Telephus, with bandaged thigh, sitting on an altar, holding a spear in his right hand, and the infant Orestes with his left arm. From the left, Agamemnon confronts Telephus, with spear. Later Italic treatments of the scene usually include both Agamemnon and Clytemnestra, often with Clytemnestra or sometimes Odysseus restraining Agamemnon from attacking Telephus.

=== Healed by Achilles ===
The healing of Telephus was, according to tradition, depicted by the fifth-century BC Athenian painter Parrhasius. An engraved Etruscan bronze mirror, from the second half of the fourth century BC (Berlin, Antikensammlung Fr. 35) and a marble bas-relief, c. first century BC, from Herculaneum (Naples, National Archaeological Museum 6591) show Achilles healing Telephus with rust from his spear.

== Tragic tradition ==
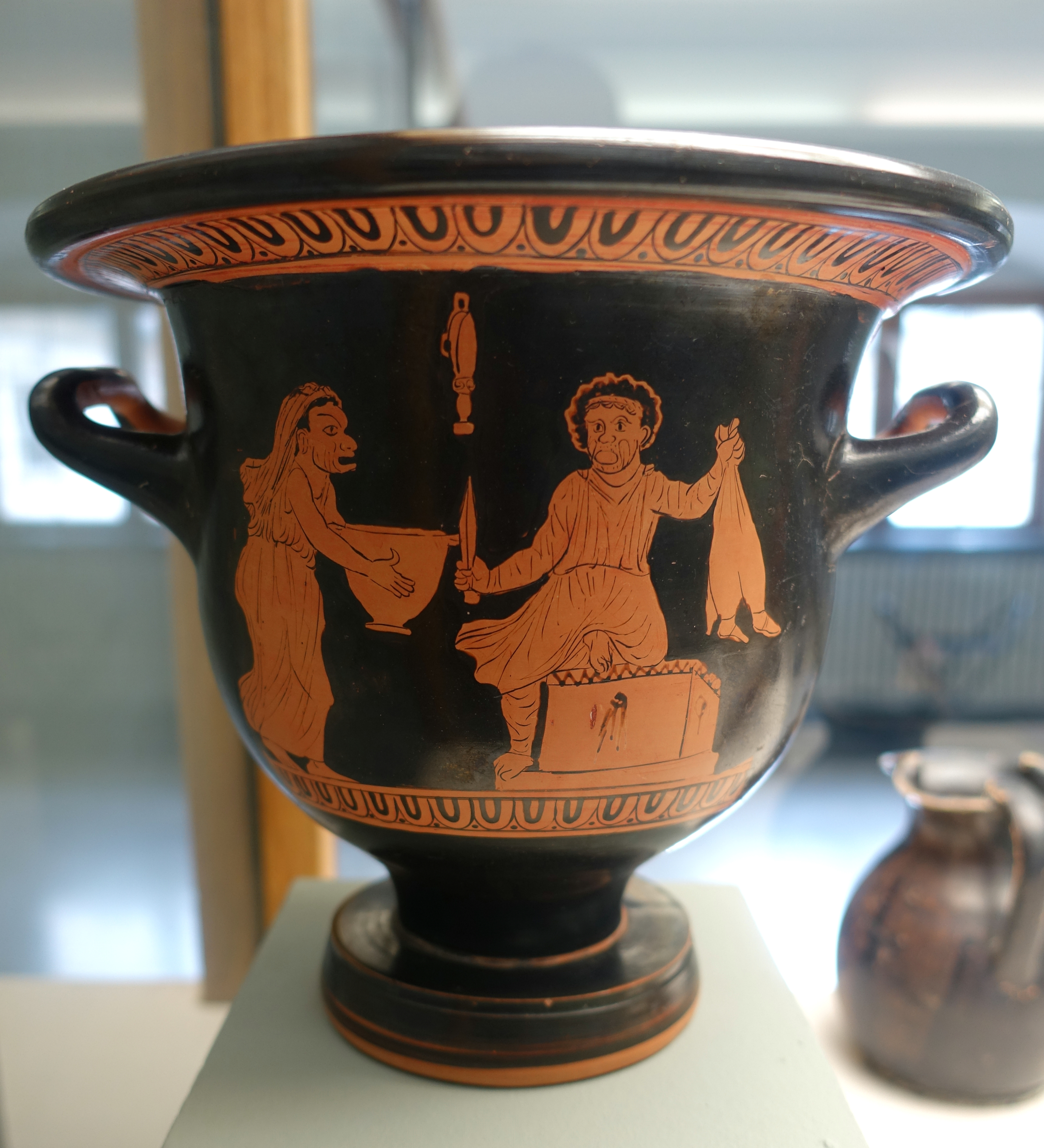
Scene from Aristophanes' Women at the Thesmophoria, (733-755), lampooning the Euripidean Telephus holding Orestes hostage. Here, a man disguised as a woman kneels on a sacrificial altar, holding a "toddler" (wineskin "clothed" with children's shoes). The "mother" holds a wine jar ready to catch the "blood" of the slaughtered child. Bell krater from Apulia, c. 370 BC, Martin von Wagner Museum H 5697.

Telephus was a popular tragic hero, whose family history figured in several Greek tragedies. Aristotle writes that "the best tragedies are written about a few families—Alcmaeon for instance and Oedipus and Orestes and Meleager and Thyestes and Telephus." All of these plays about Telephus are now lost. We know of them only through preserved fragments, and the reports of other ancient writers. Each of the three great tragedians Aeschylus, Sophocles and Euripides wrote multiple plays which featured the story.

Aeschylus wrote a play called Mysians which perhaps told the story of Telephus coming to Mysia and seeking purification for having killed his maternal uncles. Aeschylus wrote another play Telephus thought to be a sequel to Mysians, in which Telephus comes to Argos seeking the healing of his wound, and perhaps also included Telephus' seizure of Orestes as hostage.

Sophocles probably wrote at least four plays: Aleadae (The Sons of Aleus), Mysians, Telephus, and Eurypylus, involving Telephus and his family. A fifth play The Gathering of the Achaeans possibly also involved Telephus. A fourth-century BC inscription mentions a Telepheia by Sophocles, which may refer to a trilogy or tetralogy on Telephus, perhaps including one or more of these plays. The Sons of Aleus presumably told the story of Telephus' killing his uncles, and thus fulfilling the oracle (see above). Fragments suggest a quarrel over Telephus' illegitimate birth, which perhaps resulted in the killings. Mysians and Telephus are presumed to continue the story of Telephus, after his arrival as an adult in Mysia. Sophocles' Eurypylus apparently told the story of Tellephus' son Eurypylus, killed at Troy by Achilles son Neoptolemus. The irony of Achilles' son, killing Telephus' son, using the same spear that Achilles had used to heal Telephus, apparently also figured in the tragedy.

Euripides wrote a play Auge (see above) which told the circumstances of Telephus' birth. His mother Auge, having been raped by a drunken Heracles, the infant Telephus is found in Athena's temple, ordered put to death, but saved by Heracles. Euripides, like Aeschylus and Sophocles, also wrote a play entitled Telephus. Euripides' Telephus (see above) famously told the story of Telephus going to Argos disguised as a beggar where, after taking Orestes as hostage, he agreed to guide the Greeks to Troy in return for the healing of his wound.

A measure of the fame of Euripides' Telephus can be inferred from two comedies of Aristophanes (c. 446 – c. 386 BC), which extensively parodied the play. In the Acharnians, the comic hero of the play, Dicaeopolis, modelled on the Euripidean Telephus, takes as hostage a charcoal basket, and borrows Telephus' beggar costume from Euripides (who appears as a character in the play), to wear as a disguise. In Women at the Thesmophoria, a kinsman of Euripides (who again is a character in the play), disguises himself (as a women). When he is exposed, he grabs an infant (which turns out to be a disguised wineskin) as hostage, and takes refuge at a sacrificial altar.

Several later tragic poets apparently also wrote plays on the subject. The late fifth-century poet Agathon, (probably the most well known tragedian after Aeschylus, Sophocles and Euripides) wrote plays with titles Mysians and Telephus. Another late fifth-century poet Iophon, and the fourth-century poets Cleophon and Moschion, each wrote plays called Telephus. The fourth-century poet Aphareus wrote an Auge, and the Hellenistic Nicomachus of Alexandria in Troas wrote a Mysians.

The Roman poets Ennius (c. 239–169 BC), and Accius (170–c. 86 BC) also wrote plays called Telephus.

== Pergamon ==
Telephus was considered to be the mythical founder of Pergamon, as well as the ancestor of the Attalids, Pergamon's ruling dynasty (from 241 BC). As early as a Milesian inscription (after 129 BC), the people of Pergamon were called Telephidai, descendants of Telephus. According to Pausanias, the Pergamon people claimed to be descendants of the Arcadians who had come with Telephus to Mysia. Inscriptions record the association between Pergamon and Tegea, and the most important cult of Pergamon, the cult of Athena, was said to have been brought from Tegea, and established at Pergamon by Auge.

Their claimed descent from the hero Telephos, as prominently proclaimed by the Telephus frieze, was used by the Attalids to legitimize their claim to sovereignty, and to establish Pergamon's Greek heritage. Telephus was the object of ritual hero worship at Pergamon. According to Pausanias, the Pergamenes sung hymns and made offerings to Telephus.

== Cult ==
As noted above, Telephus was the object of cult hero worship at Pergamon. Telephus was also worshipped on Mount Parthenion in Arcadia, and honored at Tegea, where he was shown on the pediment of the Temple of Athena Alea at Tegea, fighting Achilles.
