= Gongylos =

5th-century BCE Greek statesman

- Γογγύλος
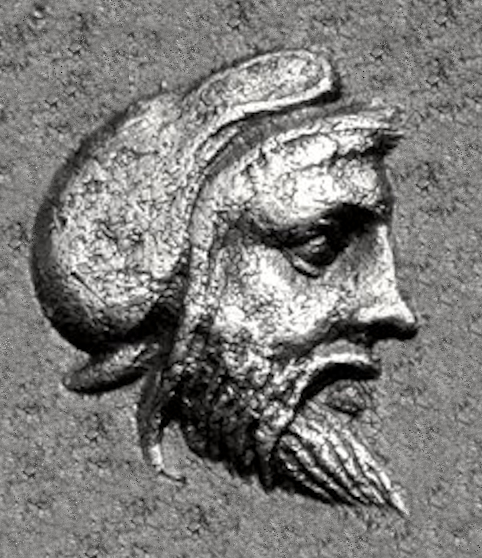
- Likely portrait of one of the Gongylid rulers, from a 5th century coin of Pergamon.
- Military career
- Allegiance: Achaemenid Empire
- Rank: Governor
- Conflicts: Second Persian invasion of Greece in 479 BCE

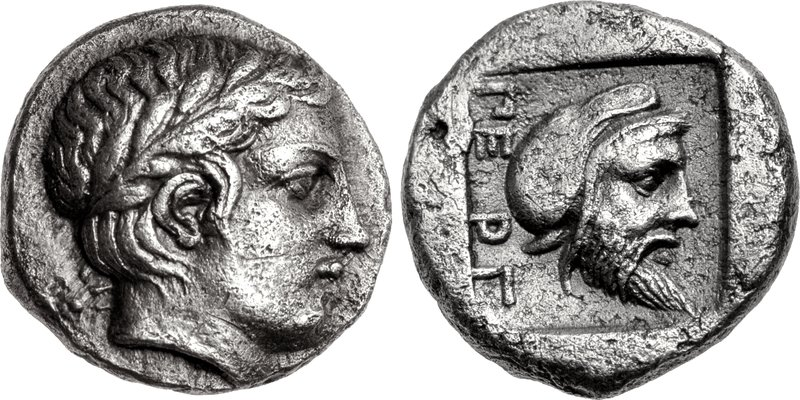
Possible coinage of Gongylos, with Apollo on the obverse, and Gongylos wearing the Persian cap on the reverse, as ruler of Pergamon for the Achaemenid Empire. Pergamon, Mysia, circa 450 BCE. The name of the city ΠΕΡΓ ("PERG"), appears for the first time on this coinage, the first evidence for the name of the city.

Location of Pergamon and nearby Gambrium, Palaegambrium, Myrina and Grynium, where the Gongylids ruled.

Gongylos (Ancient Greek: Γογγύλος), from Eretria in Euboea, was a 5th-century BCE Greek statesman who served as an intermediary between the Spartans and Xerxes I of the Achaemenid Empire, and was a supporter of the latter.

After the defeat of the Second Persian invasion of Greece in 479 BCE, Gongylos was forced to flee and take refuge in the Achaemenid Empire. There, Xerxes granted him the territory of Pergamon in Asia Minor from circa 470-460 BCE as a reward. His descendants ruled over the city until at least 400 BCE, forming the Gongylid dynasty of satraps. Gongylos was one of the several Greek aristocrats who took refuge in the Achaemenid Empire following reversals at home, other famous ones being Hippias, Demaratos, and Themistocles. In general, those were generously welcomed by the Achaemenid kings, and received land grants to support them, and ruled over various cities of Asia Minor.

According to Xenophon (Anabasis, 7.8.8-17), when he arrived in Mysia in 399, he met Hellas, the widow of Gongylos and probable daughter of Themistocles, who was living at Pergamon. His two sons, Gorgion and Gongylos the younger, ruled respectively over the cities of Gambrium and Palaegambrium for Gorgion, and Myrina and Grynium for Gongylos. Xenophon received some support from the descendants of Gongylos for his campaign into Asia Minor, as well as from the descendants of Demaratos, a Spartan exile who also had become a satrap for the Achaemenids, in the person of his descendant Prokles.

It is thought that the Greek dynasts of Pergamon were punished following the Peace of Antalcidas in 386 BCE for their support of the Greeks against the Achaemenids. However, by the mid-4th century BCE, the Achaemenid satrap Orontes again allowed the people of Pergamon to settle on the acropolis of their city. This lasted until the conquests of Alexander the Great, when Pergamon became part of the Macedonian Empire.
