= Demaratus =

Eurypontid king of Sparta from c.515 to 491 BC

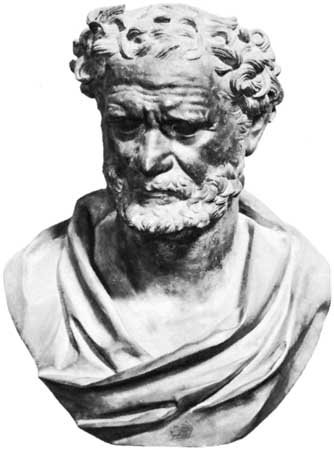
Bronze Statue of Demaratus in the Naples Museo Archeologico

Demaratus (Greek: Δημάρατος, Demaratos; Doric: Δαμάρατος, Damaratos) was a king of Sparta from around 515 BC to 491 BC. He was the 15th ruler of the Eurypontid dynasty and the firstborn son of King Ariston. During his reign, Demaratus is best known for his opposition to his co-ruler, King Cleomenes I of the Agiad dynasty. This rivalry ultimately led to his dethronement around 491 BC, following Cleomenes's accusations of illegitimacy and political maneuvering.

After his removal from power, Demaratus sought refuge in the Achaemenid Empire, where he was welcomed by King Darius I. He was granted land and cities in Asia Minor, integrating him into Persian society while retaining his influence. Demaratus served as an advisor to Xerxes I during the Second Persian invasion of Greece, providing strategic insights about Greek military tactics.

== Early life ==
Demaratus was born into the Eurypontid dynasty of Sparta and was the firstborn son of King Ariston. His father's significance in the highly structured Spartan society meant Demaratus's firstborn status held considerable weight. According to Herodotus, Demaratus's birth was accompanied by a prophecy that suggested his future prominence and influence, with his name meaning "wished by the people." In Herodotus's writing, we see that King Ariston initially doubted his son's true parentage. "And he, after remembering when he had married the woman and counting out the months on his fingers, swore an oath: 'He could not be my own son!'" As Demaratus grew, Ariston repented what he had sworn and regarded Demaratus as his own.

Upon King Ariston's death, Demaratus ascended to the throne around 515 BCE. His rise to kingship made him the 15th ruler of the Eurypontid line. His succession appears fairly straightforward, as Ariston eventually claimed Demaratus as his own son.

== Reign ==
=== Reign in Sparta ===
When Cleomenes attempted to make Isagoras tyrant in Athens, Demaratus tried to frustrate the plans. In 491 BC, Aegina was one of the states that gave the symbols of submission (earth and water) to Persia. Athens at once appealed to Sparta to punish that act of medism, and Cleomenes I crossed over to the island to arrest those responsible. His first attempt was unsuccessful because of interference from Demaratus, who did his utmost to bring Cleomenes into disfavor at home.

In retaliation, Cleomenes urged Leotychidas, a relative and personal enemy of Demaratus, to claim the throne on the grounds that the latter was really the son not of Ariston but of Agetus, his mother's first husband. Leotychidas's anger towards Demaratus was due to a dispute over the marriage of Perkalon, the daughter of Chilon, son of Demarmenos. Initially, Leotychidas was arranged to marry Perkalon, but Demaratus seized her as his own. Cleomenes bribed the Delphic oracle to pronounce in favor of Leotychidas, who became king in 491 BC.

After the deposition of Demaratus, Cleomenes visited the island of Aegina for a second time. Accompanied by his new colleague, Leotychidas, he seized ten of the leading citizens and deposited them at Athens as hostages.

=== In exile ===
Location of Pergamon and nearby Teuthrania and Halisarna, where Demaratus ruled as an Achaemenid Satrap.

On his abdication, Demaratus was forced to flee. He went to the court of Persian King Xerxes I, who gave him the cities of Teuthrania and Halisarna, around Pergamum.

Demaratus accompanied Xerxes I on his invasion of Greece in 480 BC and is alleged to have warned Xerxes not to underestimate the Spartans before the Battle of Thermopylae:

The same goes for the Spartans. One-against-one, they are as good as anyone in the world. But when they fight in a body, they are the best of all. For though they are free men, they are not entirely free. They accept Law as their master. And they respect this master more than your subjects respect you. Whatever he commands, they do. And his command never changes: It forbids them to flee in battle, whatever the number of their foes. He requires them to stand firm – to conquer or die. O king, if I seem to speak foolishly, I am content from this time forward to remain silent. I only spoke now because you commanded me to. I do hope that everything turns out according to your wishes.

— Herodotus vii (trans. G. Rawlinson)

Xerxes also asked Demaratus about his knowledge of the Greeks and if they would put up a fight against the Persian army. In response, Demaratus spoke favorably about the Greeks even after he had been deposed and exiled from Sparta:

So Demaratus said, 'my lord, you have asked me to tell the whole truth—the kind of truth that you will not be able to prove false at a later date. There has never been a time when poverty was not a factor in the rearing of the Greeks, but their courage has been acquired as a result of intelligence and the force of law. Greece has relied on this courage to keep poverty and despotism at bay. I admire all the Greeks who live in those Dorian lands, but I shall restrict what I have to say to the Lacedaemonians alone. First, then, there's no way in which they will ever listen to any proposals of yours which will bring slavery on Greece; second, they will certainly resist you, even if all the other Greeks come over to your side. As for the size of their army, there's no point in your asking how, in terms, of numbers, they can do this. If there are in fact only a thousand men to march out against you (though it may be fewer or it may be more), then a thousand men will fight you.'

— Herodotus vii (trans. Robin Waterfield)

== Death and succession ==
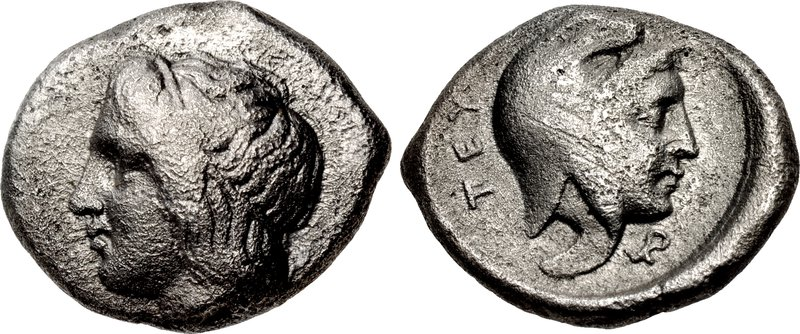
Coin of Prokles, brother and co-ruler of Eurysthenes, as Dynast of Teuthrania and Halisarna, and descendants of Demaratus, c. 400–399 BC. Teuthrania, Mysia. Laureate head of Apollo (left), head of Prokles (right) wearing Persian headdress.

There is no known year for Demaratus's death. Afterward, however, his sons, Eurysthenes and Prokles, succeeded him in ruling over the cities of Halisarna and Teuthrania in Aeolis. This succession maintained the connection between Demaratus's lineage and the city granted to him by the Persian king. His descendants ruled this area for approximately the next 80 years.

Demaratus's family continued to flourish in Asia as subjects of the Persians, and several of his descendants have been identified. One of them was likely Demaratus, the son of Gorgion, who was restored to Sparta in the early 3rd century BC and was, in turn, the putative great-grandfather of Nabis, the last king of Sparta (ruled 207–192).

== Greek exiles in Achaemenid Empire ==
Demaratus was one of several Greeks aristocrats who took refuge in the Achaemenid Empire after reversals at home. Other famous cases were Themistocles and Gongylos. In general, they were generously rewarded by the Achaemenid kings, received land grants to support them and ruled over various cities in Asia Minor.

== See also ==
- Kings of Sparta

== Bibliography ==
- Paul Cartledge & Antony Spawforth, Hellenistic and Roman Sparta, A tale of two cities, London and New York, Routledge, 2002 (originally published in 1989). ISBN 0-415-26277-1
- Brenda Griffith-Williams, "The Succession to the Spartan Kingship, 520-400 BC", Bulletin of the Institute of Classical Studies, Vol. 54, No. 2 (2011), pp. 43–58".

Preceded by Ariston	Eurypontid King of Sparta; C. 515 BC – c. 491 BC	Succeeded by Leotychidas
