= Aliağa =

- District and municipality
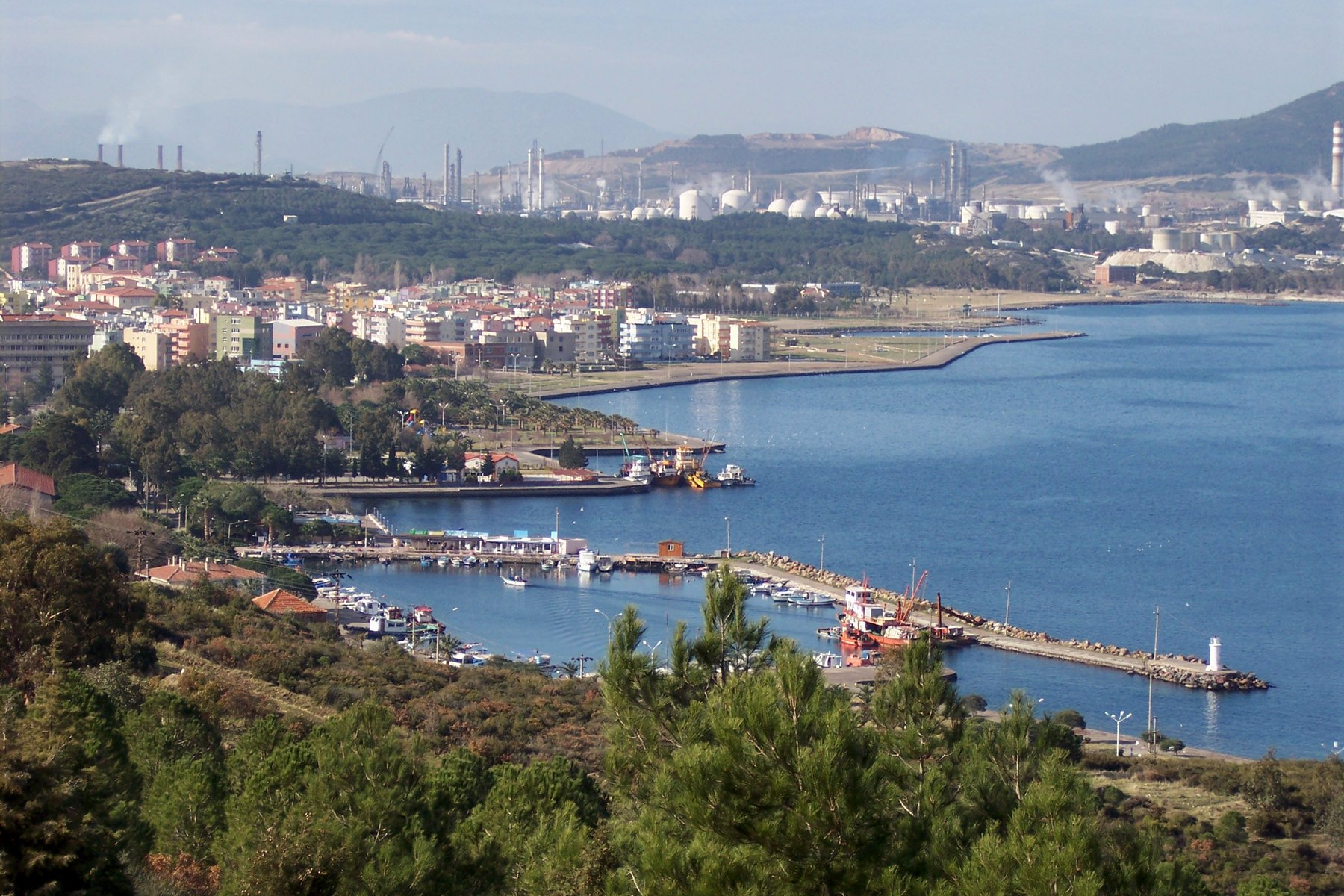

- Logo

- Map showing Aliağa District in İzmir Province

- Location within Turkey Location within İzmir
- Coordinates: 38°48′03″N 26°58′22″E
- Country: Turkey
- Province: İzmir

Government
  - Mayor: Serkan Acar (MHP)
- Area: 379 km^{2} (146 sq mi)
- Elevation: 2 m (6.6 ft)
- Population (2022): 104,828
  - Density: 277/km^{2} (716/sq mi)
- Time zone: UTC+3 (TRT)
- Postal code: 35800
- Area code: 0232
- Website: www.aliaga.bel.tr

Aliağa (Turkish: [aˈlia’ɣa]) is a municipality and district of İzmir Province, Turkey. Its area is 379 km^{2}, and its population is 104,828 (2022). The town is situated at about 50 km (31 mi) north of İzmir. Aliağa has a large port, mainly for oil and bulk cargo. Its economic activity is based on tourism, shipbreaking, and an oil refinery.

== Overview and history ==
Aliağa lies in the heart of ancient Aeolia. The town was named after a member of the influential Karaosmanoğulları ayan family, Karaosmanoğlu Ali Ağa, who owned an estate here. Before the Greco-Turkish War (1919–1922) the population of the town was mainly Greek. It was a township in Menemen district in 1937 and became a municipality in 1952. It finally separated from Menemen and became a district on 21 January 1982. The remains of the ancient city of Myrina are within the boundaries of the district, located at about fifteen km north of Aliağa centre. Another ancient site is the yet unexplored Gryneion, near Şakran township on the peninsula, to the south of the center town, also at a distance of 15 km (9 mi). Visitors also often use the road from Aliağa to visit the remains of Aigai in Yuntdağı in Manisa Province.

In 2021, a monastery and floor mosaic were found here during an illegal excavation. Archaeologists believe that the monastery was used from the 4th century to the 14th century.

== Composition ==
There are 30 neighbourhoods in Aliağa District:

- Aşağışakran
- Atatürk
- Bahçedere
- Barbaros Hayrettin Paşa
- Bozköy
- Çakmaklı
- Çaltılıdere
- Çıtak
- Çoraklar
- Fatih
- Güzelhisar
- Hacıömerli
- Horozgediği
- Kalabak
- Kapıkaya
- Karaköy
- Karakuzu
- Kazım Dirik
- Kültür
- Kurtuluş
- Mimar Sinan
- Samurlu
- Şehitkemal
- Siteler
- Uzunhasanlar
- Yalı
- Yeni
- Yenişakran
- Yukarışehitkemal
- Yüksekköy

== Transport ==
The D.550 roadway runs through the city, between Muğla-Edirne and also to İzmir. Aliağa is also connected to İzmir by İZBAN, a commuter railway operating around İzmir. İZBAN operates 15 daily trains from Aliağa Railway Station to Alsancak Terminal in İzmir. ESHOT operates the 834 bus line to İzmir as well.

== Economy ==
=== Ship-breaking ===
There are several facilities for dismantling and scrapping ships. The 2020 COVID-19 pandemic sped up the process of ship recycling because owners of idled cruise ships looked to stem the red ink.

=== Gallery ===
Aliağa ship-breaking yard

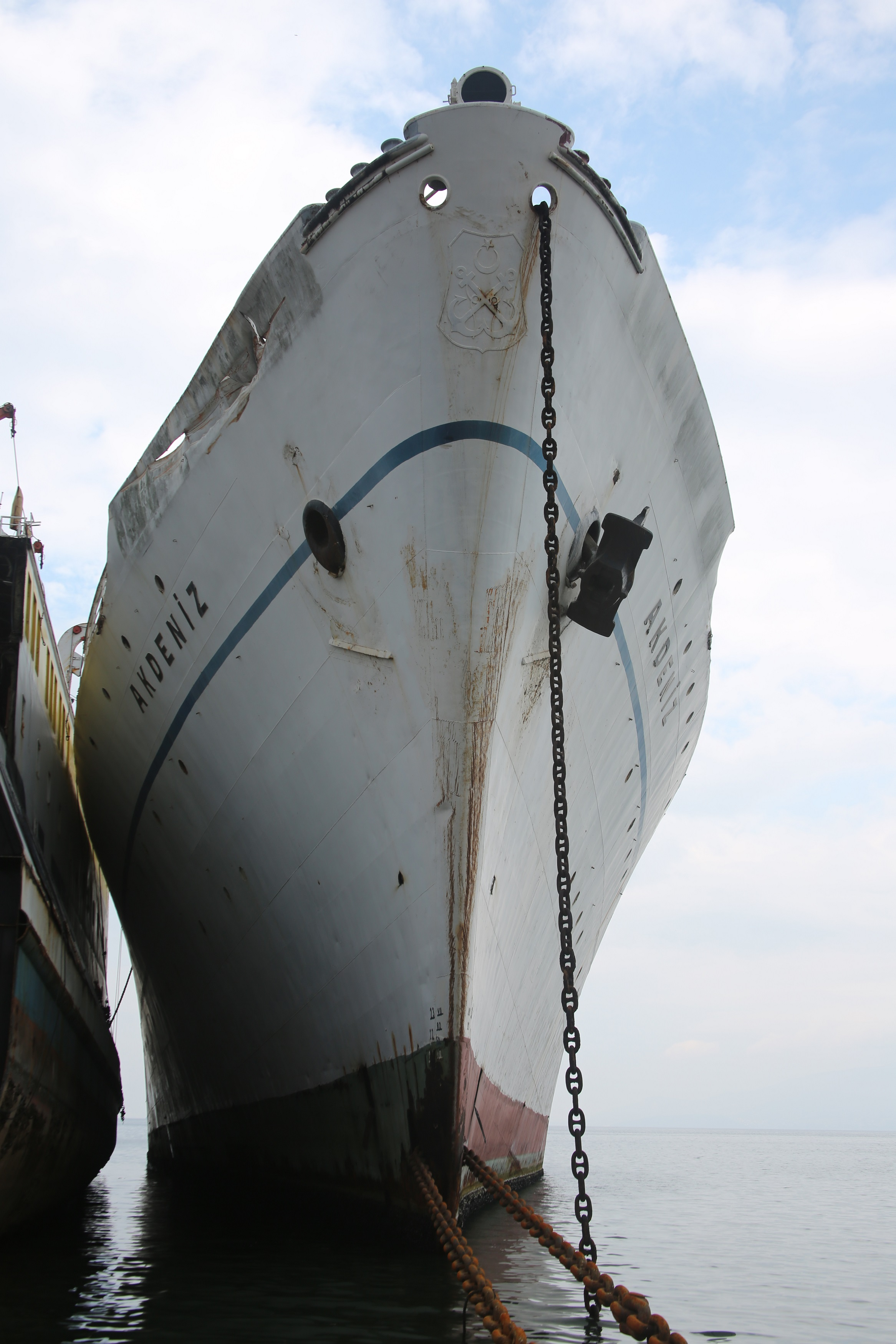

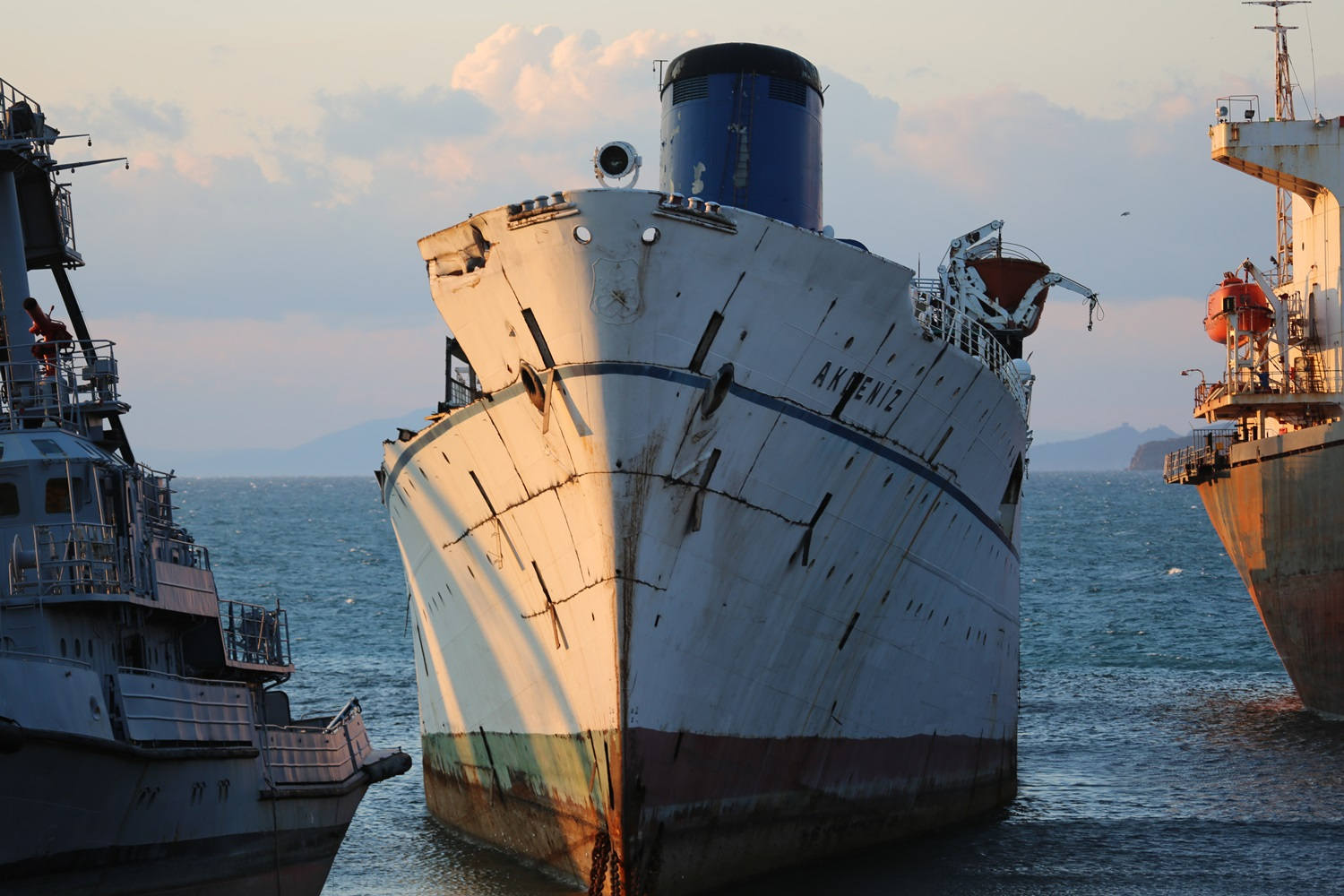

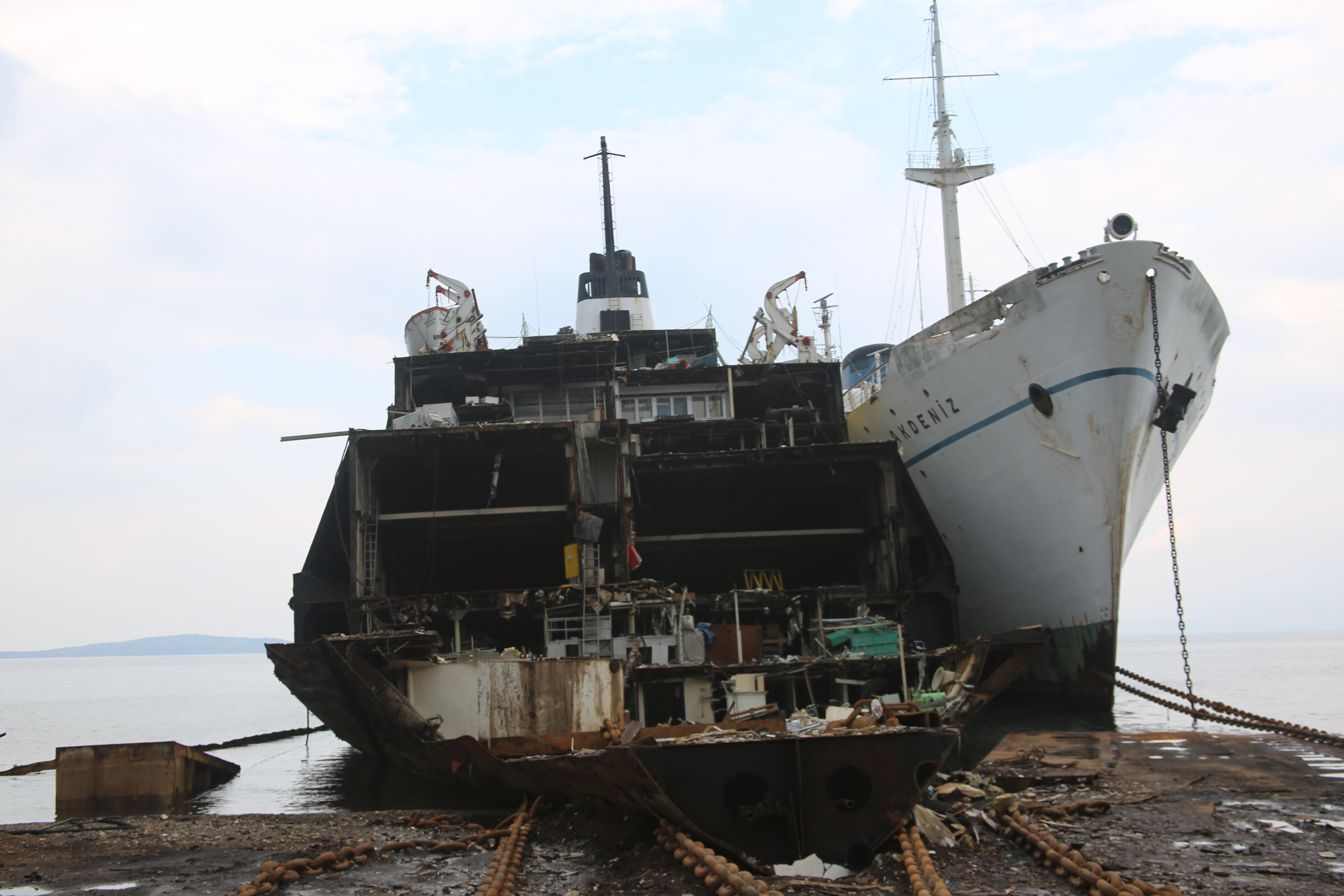

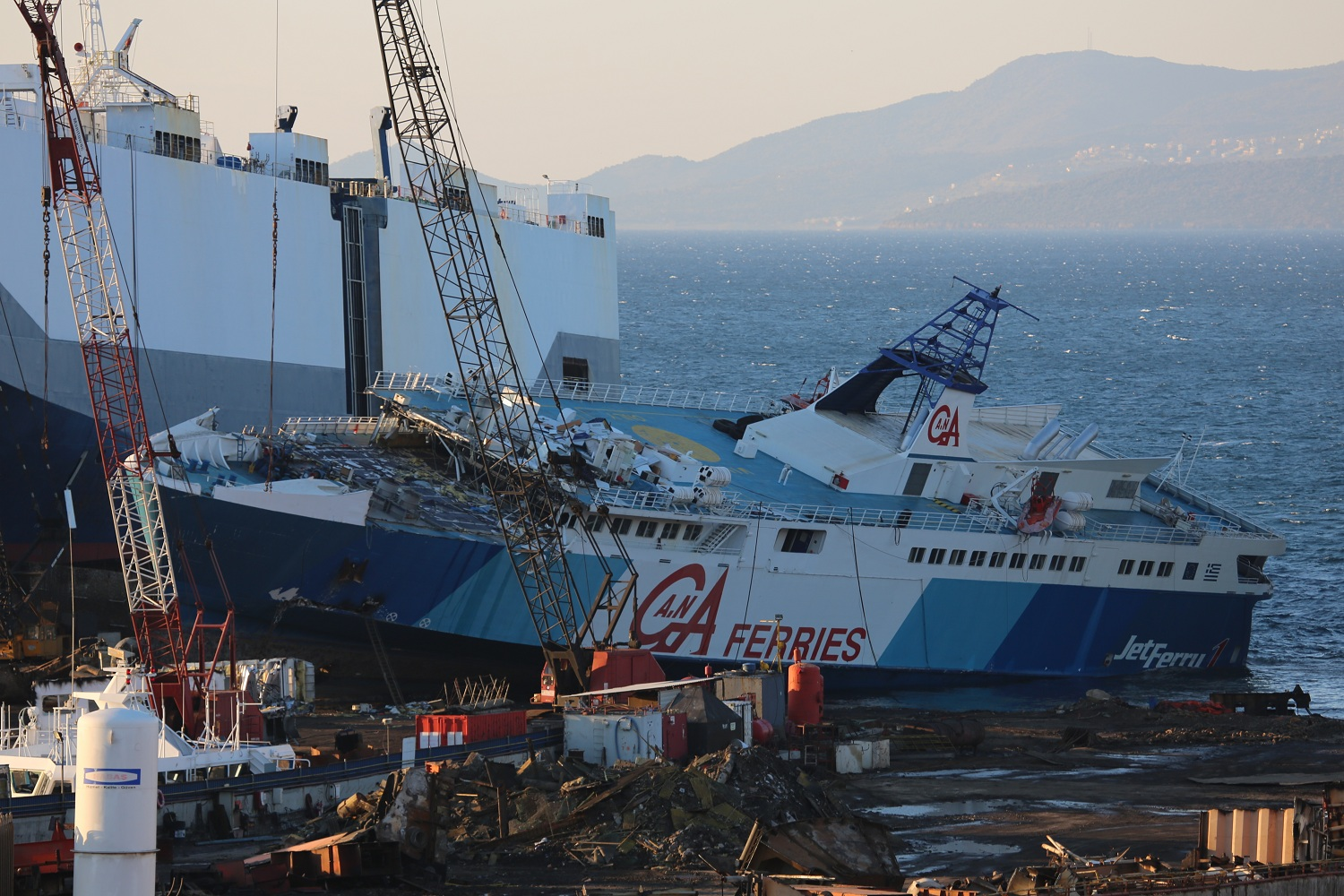

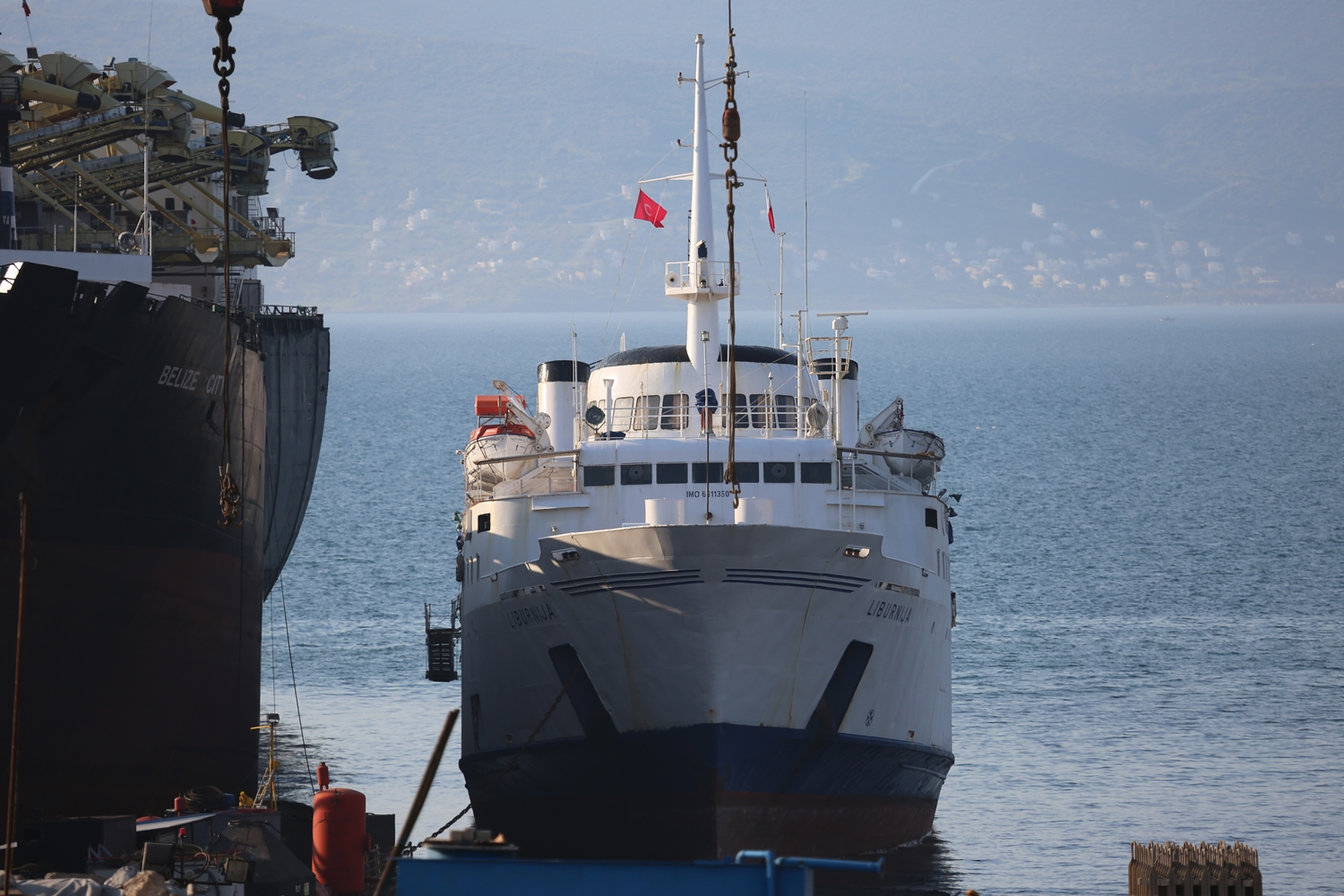

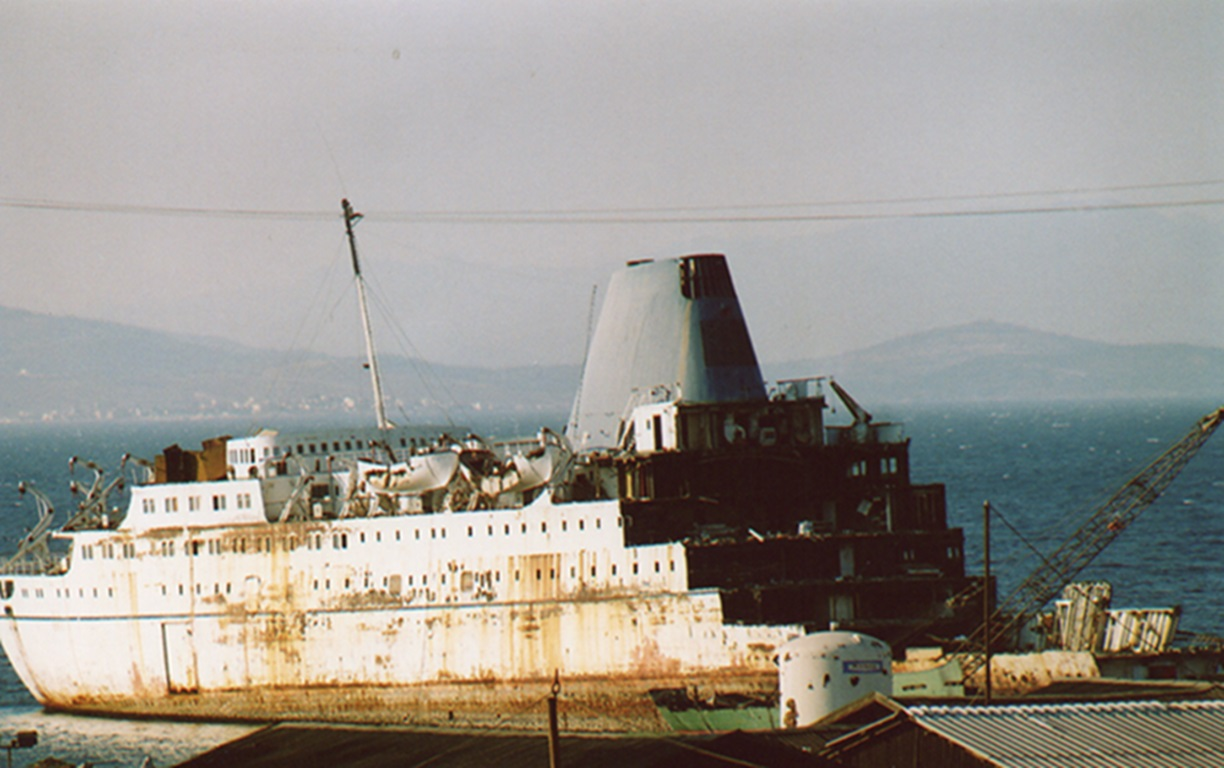

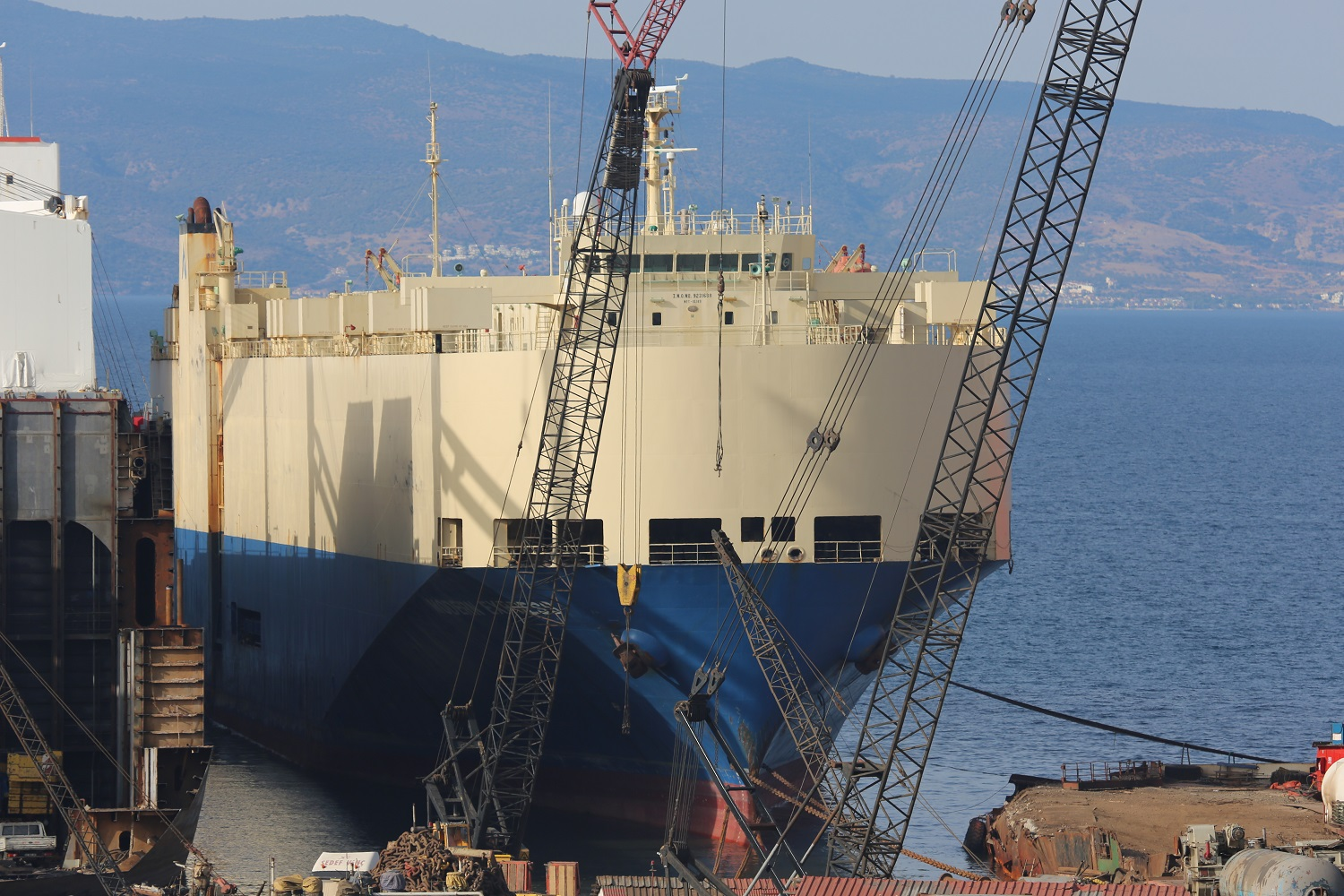

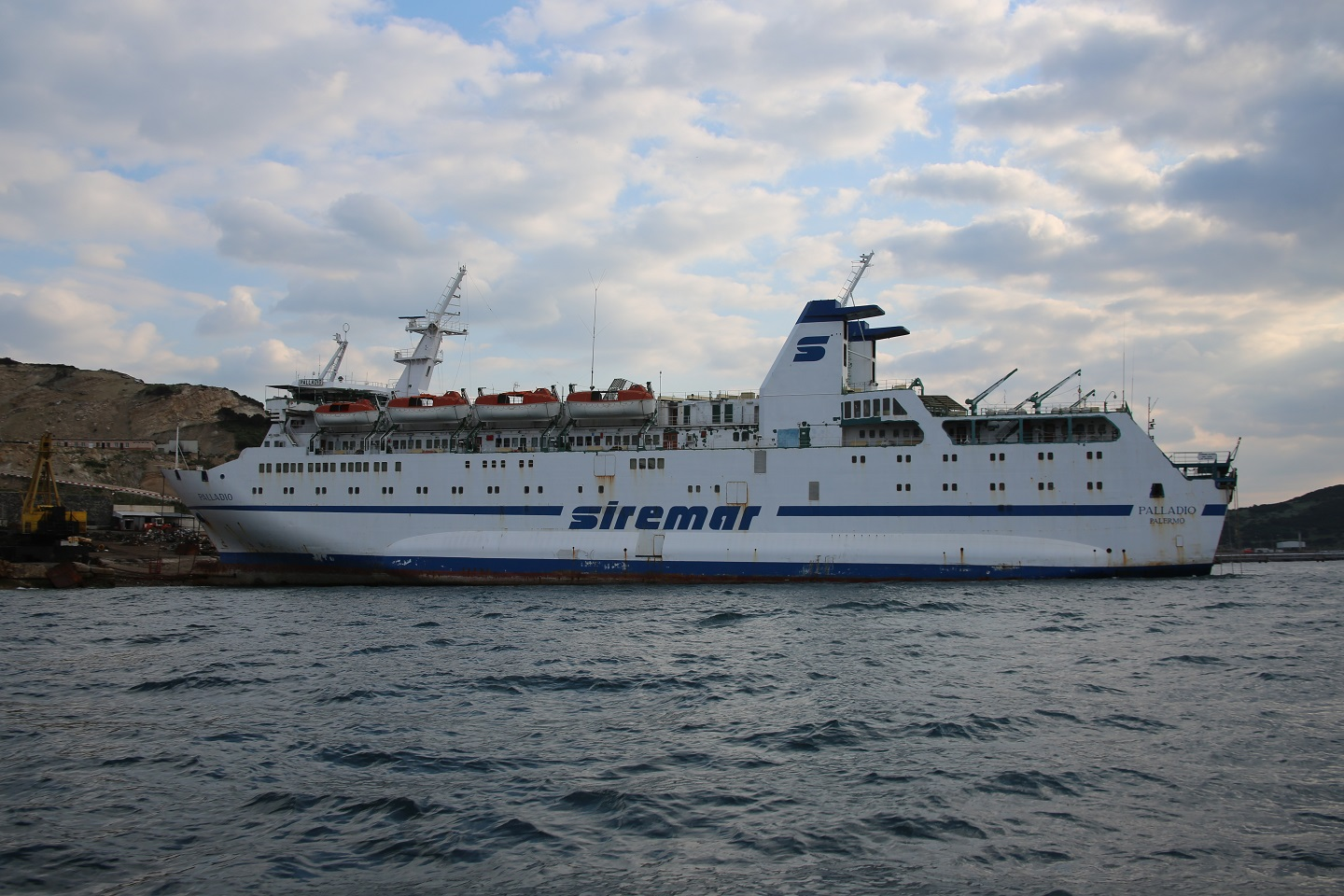

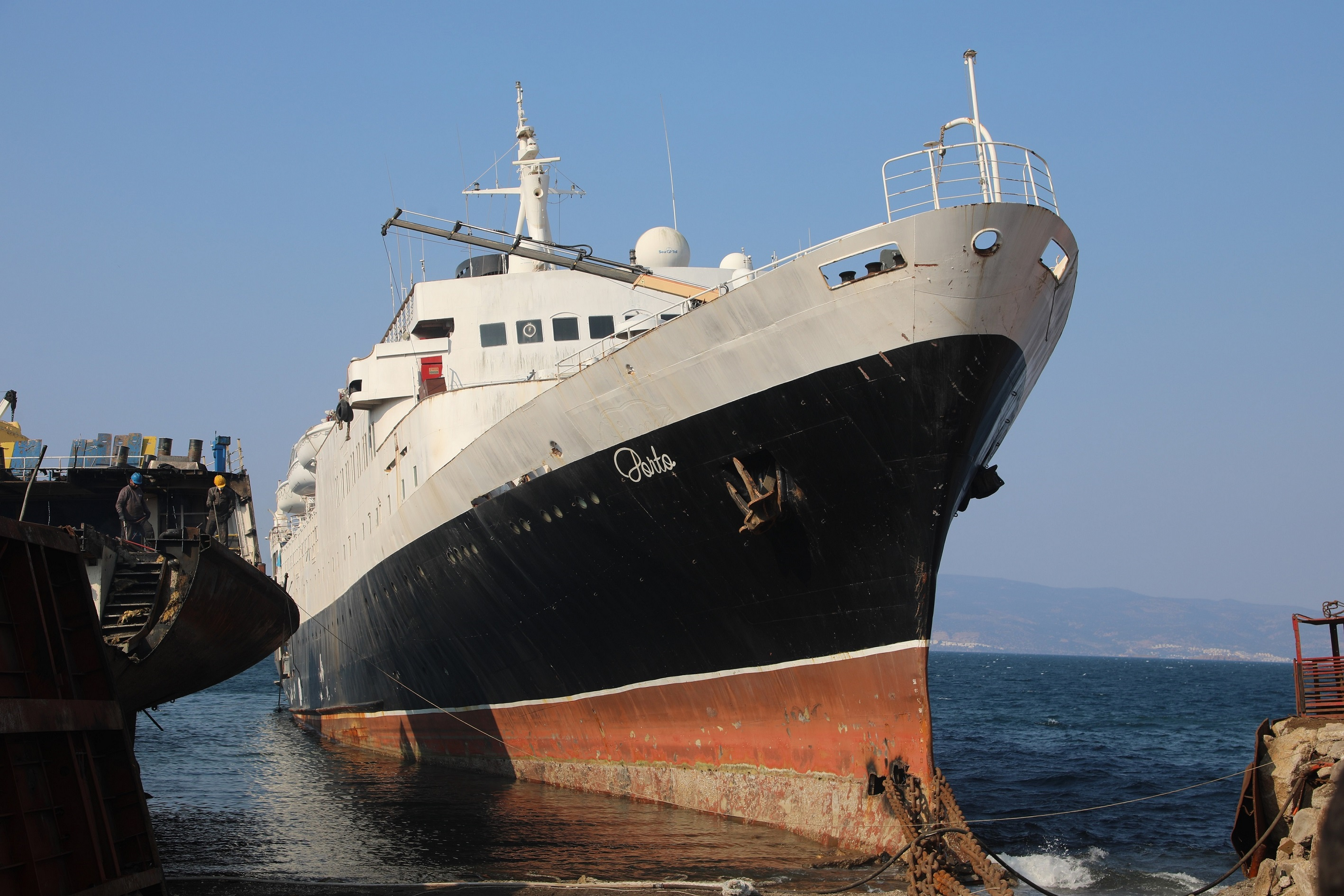

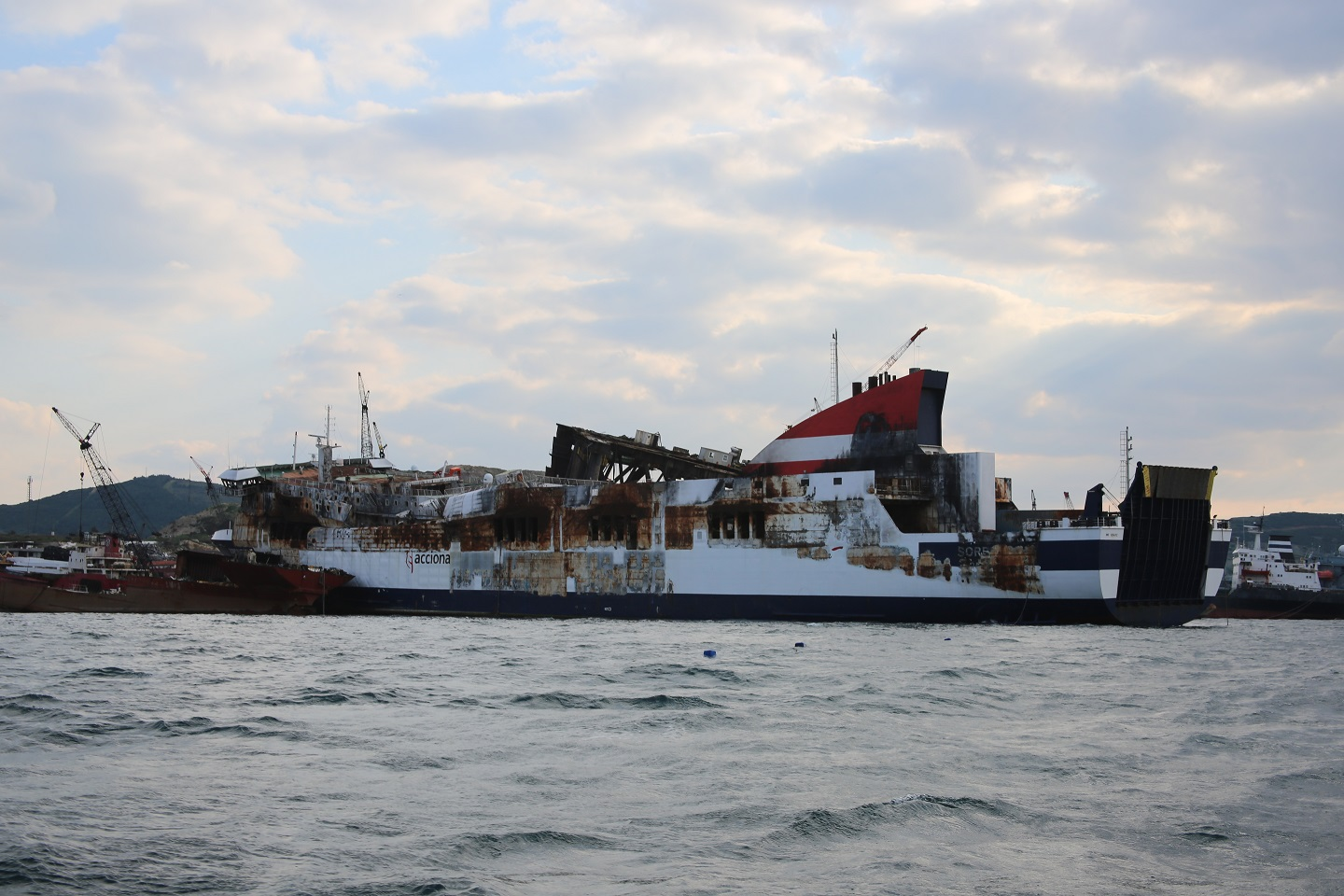

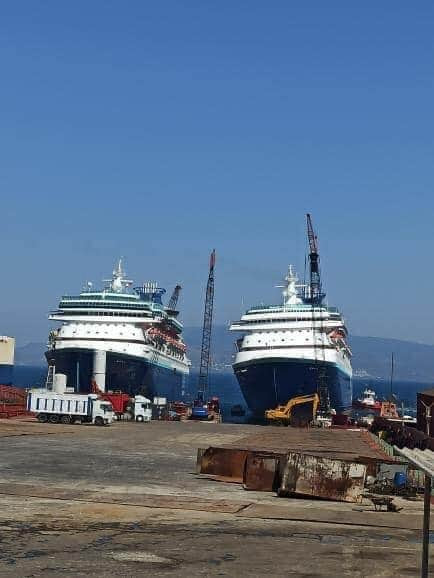

== See also ==
- Petkim
- Aigai (Aeolis)
- Egegaz Aliağa LNG Storage Facility
- Kyme
- Gryneion
