= Eurypylus (son of Telephus) =

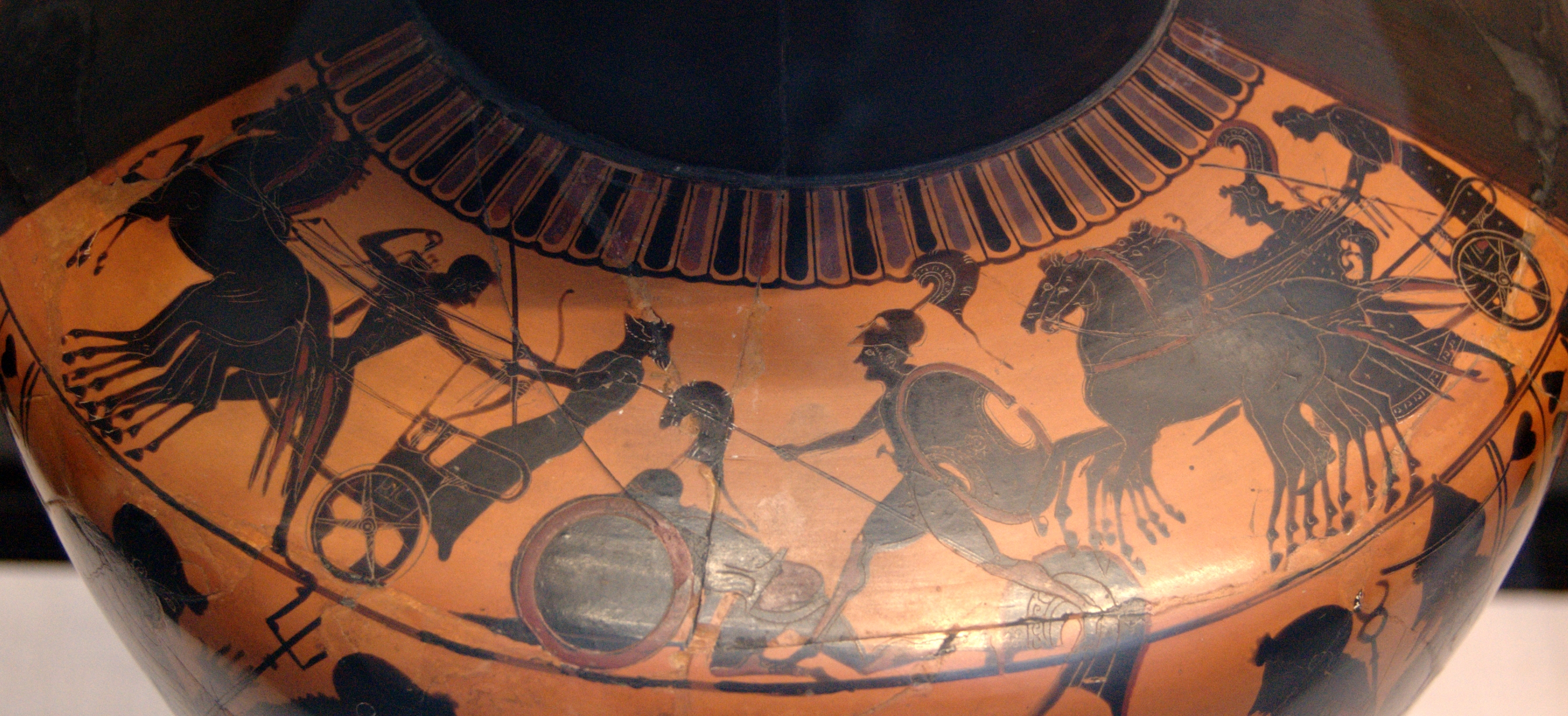
Eurypylus(?) killed by Neoptolemus. Attica black-figure hydria attributed to the Antimenes Painter, 550–500 BC, Martin von Wagner Museum (L 309).

In Greek mythology, Eurypylus ("Broadgate") (/jʊəˈrɪpɪləs/'; Ancient Greek: Εὐρύπυλος, romanized: Eurupulos, lit. 'wide-gated') was the son of Telephus, king of Mysia. He was a great warrior, who led a Mysian contingent that fought alongside the Trojans against the Greeks in the Trojan War. He killed Machaon, and was himself killed by Achilles' son Neoptolemus.

== Mythology ==
Eurypylus' father was Telephus, who was the son of Heracles, and was the king of Mysia in Asia Minor. Telephus' mother was Auge, the daughter of Aleus, the king of Tegea, a city in Arcadia, in the Peloponnese of mainland Greece. Auge ended up at the court of the Mysian king Teuthras, as his wife, and Telephus became Teuthras' adopted son and succeeded Teuthras as king. According to one account, Telephus' wife was Laodice, the daughter of Priam, king of nearby Troy, while according to another, Telephus married Agriope a daughter of Teuthras. However, accounts that mention Eurypylus' mother, say that she was Astyoche, who was (usually) Priam's sister.

In a prelude to the Trojan War, the Greeks attacked Mysia, mistaking it for Troy. Eurypylus' father Telephus was wounded by Achilles and later, when his wound continued to fester, was also healed by Achilles. Because of this (according to some accounts), Telephus promised that neither he nor his family would aid the Trojans in the coming war. Nevertheless, during the final stages of the war, between the death of Achilles, and the ruse of the Trojan Horse, Eurypylus led a large Mysian force to fight on the side of Troy. Eurypylus was a great warrior, and killed many opponents, including Machaon, Nireus, and Peneleus. But Neoptolemus finally killed Eurypylus, using the same spear that his father Achilles had used to both wound and heal Eurypylus' father Telephus.

Homer has Odysseus say that Eurypylus was, next to Memnon, the most beautiful (κάλλιστον) man he had ever seen. By some accounts Priam obtained Eurypylus' aid in the war by giving his mother Astyoche a golden vine, or by promising Eurypylus one of his daughters as wife. According to Servius, Eurypylus had a son, Grynus, who became king in Mysia and was known as the eponym of Gryneion and the founder of Pergamon.

== Early sources ==
The earliest mention of Eurypylus occurs in Homer's Odyssey. In the underworld, Odysseus meets Achilles' ghost who asks Odysseus to tell him about his son Neoptolemus. Odysseus tells how, during the fighting at Troy, Achilles' son killed a great warrior, the magnificent and beautiful Eurypylus, son of Telephus. And that Eurypylus, and many others with him, had died because of "womanly gifts".

Homer says nothing more about these "gifts". But, if Telephus's promise not to aid the Trojans was a tradition known to Homer, then Eurypylus' appearance at Troy might have required some explanation, to which the "gifts" might refer. Later commentators on Homer offered two explanations of these "gifts". A scholion to this Odyssey passage says that, according to the 6th century BC mythographer Acusilaus, Eurypylus' mother was Astyoche, and that Priam, the king of Troy, asked Eurypylus, who had inherited his father Telephus' kingdom of Mysia, for aid in Troy's war with the Greeks. But Eurypylus refused Priam's request because of his mother. So Priam gave Astyoche a golden vine, and she sent her son to Troy. From other scholia on the same Odyssey passage, and a scholiast on Euripides, we learn that Astyoche was Priam's sister, and that the golden vine was a family heirloom, made by Hephaestus, and given by Zeus to an earlier king of Troy (either Tros or Laomedon) in compensation for Zeus' abduction of his son Ganymede. These other Odyssey scholia also give an alternate explanation of Homer's "gifts", saying that Priam had offered to give Eurypylus one of his daughters to be his wife.

Eurypylus's exploits at Troy apparently formed part of the Little Iliad (c. 7th century BC?), one of the poems of the Epic Cycle. According to the 2nd century AD geographer Pausanias, the Little Iliad told of Eurypylus killing Machaon. Proculus, in his summary of the Little Iliad, says that Eurypylus came to the aid of the Trojans and was slain by Neoptolemus. Eurypylus's confrontation with Neoptolemus was likely one of the poem's set-piece battles.

According to Plutarch, the duel between Eurypylus and Neoptolemus also featured in some work of Sophocles, and the play Eurypylus mentioned by Aristotle, was probably that work. The Sophoclean play had a messenger, reporting on Eurypylus's death to his mother Astyoche, tell of Priam lying upon Eurypylus's mangled corpse saying "Ah, my son, I betrayed you, though I had in you the last and greatest hope of salvation for the Phrygians. Though you were not our guest for long, you will leave the memory of many sorrows ... neither Memnon nor Sarpedon caused so many sorrows, though they were foremost among spearmen." The play also had Astyoche reproach herself and Priam, saying: "the lord of Ida, my brother Priam, who in all foolishness persuaded me, wretch, to do an accursed act." The irony of Achilles' son, killing Telephus' son, using the same spear that Achilles had used to heal Telephus, apparently also figured in the tragedy.

== Late sources ==
=== Dictys Cretensis ===
Dictys Cretensis, in his 4th century AD retelling of the Trojan War, adds several details to Eurypylus' story. Priam, in addition to giving Eurypylus a golden staff, and many other beautiful gifts, finally won Eurypylus' support, by offering him his daughter Cassandra in marriage. In the decisive battle Eurypylus was the leader of the combined Mysian and Trojan forces, and when he was finally killed by Neoptolemus, the Trojans, having placed all their hopes on Eurypylus, fled the battle and were routed. Neoptolemus ordered Eurypylus's body removed from the battle and carried to the ships, and after the battle the Greeks "cremated Eurypylus and sent his bones, in an urn, back to his father, for we remembered his father's kindness and friendship".

=== Quintus Smyrnaeus ===
The most detailed account of Eurypylus' role in the Trojan War is given in Quintus Smyrnaeus's 4th century AD epic poem the Posthomerica, which told the story of the final stages of the War. The poem covered the events between Hector's funeral, and the fall of Troy. Eurypylus appears as a principal character, in books six through eight of the poem. In book nine, Eurypylus is buried, by the Trojans, at Troy, in front of the Dardanian Gate.

==== Book six ====
Book six of the poem, describes Eurypylus coming to Troy, his first night there, and his victorious first day of battle. Eurypylus "the seed of mighty Hercules" arrives in Troy with a "great host", while:

Round them rejoicing thronged the sons of Troy:
As when tame geese within a pen gaze up
On him who casts them corn, and round his feet
Throng hissing uncouth love, and his heart warms
As he looks down on them; so thronged the sons
Of Troy, as on fierce-heart Eurypylus
They gazed;

As Eurypylus arms himself, nearly one hundred lines of the poem are devoted to an ekphrastic passage describing Eurypylus' shield, adorned with a depiction of the twelve labors of Hercules. Dressed for battle, Eurypylus "seemed the War-god", and seeing him Paris addressed him, saying:

Glad am I for thy coming, for mine heart
Trusts that the Argives all shall wretchedly
Be with their ships destroyed; for such a man
Mid Greeks or Trojans never have I seen.
Now by the strength and fury of Hercules—
To whom in stature, might, and goodlihead
Most like thou art—I pray thee, have in mind
Him, and resolve to match his deeds with thine.

"Like a black hurricane", Eurypylus rushed into battle, killing Nireus, and Machaon. And many Greeks were killed, and many fled to their ships "pressed by Eurypylus hard, an avalanche of havoc." Eurypylus, with Paris and Aeneas at his side, then "rushed with eagle-swoop" to attack Agamemnon, Menelaus, and Ajax. Ajax is wounded, and removed from the battle, while Agamemnon and Menelaus are surrounded, but Teucer, Idomeneus, Thoas, Meriones, and Thrasymedes, who earlier had all fled from Eurypylus, rush to the defense of Agamemnon and Menelaus, and Eurypylus is briefly de-speared from a stone thrown by Idomeneus. Recovering his spear, Eurypylus charged his foes and killed all who faced him, spreading "wide havoc through their ranks." And none could stand against Eurypylus, and all the Greeks fled to their ships, which were saved from being burned only by the coming of night.

==== Book seven ====
On the second day of battle, Eurypylus killed Peneleus, and many more besides: "Heaps upon heaps, here, there in throngs they fell". Again Eurypylus drove the Greeks back to their ships:

Behind the rampart of the ships they fled
In huddled rout: they had no heart to stand
Before Eurypylus,

The two armies fought before the ships through that night and the next day, the Greeks, only being able to avoid destruction, with the goddess Athena's aid. The Greeks asked Eurypylus for a two-day truce so they could bury their dead, which Eurypylus granted. Meanwhile, the Greeks had sent Odysseus and Diomedes to Scyros to ask for Neoptolemus' help. And so Neoptolemus came to Troy, and found the Greeks hard-pressed by Eurypylus, fighting at their ships. In haste, Odysseus gives Neoptolemus Achilles' armor and spear, and seeming to be Achilles himself, Neoptolemus, along with Odysseus and Diomedes, rushed to the desperate defense of the ships. Again Athena comes to the aid of the Greeks, and with Neoptolemus in the lead, the Greeks manage to withstand Eurypylus' attack:

...Verily all
The Argives had beside their ships been slain,
Had not Achilles' strong son on that day
Withstood the host of foes and their great chief
Eurypylus.

==== Book eight ====
The next day many warriors are killed on both sides,

But more than all
Eurypylus hurled doom on many a foe
...and aye as he rushed on
Fell 'neath his spear a multitude untold.
As tall trees, smitten by the strength of steel
In mountain-forest, fill the dark ravines,
Heaped on the earth confusedly, so fell
The Achaeans 'neath Eurypylus' flying spears—

Finally though, Eurypyus comes "face to face" with Achilles' son Neoptolemus. Eurypylus challenges Neoptlolemus, saying:

Who art thou? Whence hast come to brave me here?
To Hades merciless Fate is bearing thee;
But whoso eager for the fray, have come
Hither, on all have I hurled anguished death.

And Neoptolemus answers:

... Achilles' son am I,
Son of the man whose long spear smote thy sire,
And made him flee—yea, and ruthless fates
Of death had seized him, but my father's self
Healed him upon the brink of woeful death.

Then they sprang to battle, "Like terrible lions each on other rushed". The goddesses Enyo and Eris "spurred them on", and "gloated o'er them". And neither warrior gave ground, while the Olympian gods looked down, "with hearts at variance ... For some gave glory to Achilles' son, some to Eurypylus the godlike". Until finally Neoptolemes thrust his father's spear "Clear through Eurypylus' throat", killing him.

== Iconography ==
Extant representations of Eurypylus are rare. The only certain early depiction of Eurypylus, identified by inscription, is found on the shoulder of a black-figure Attic hydria, c. 510 BC (Basel BS 498). Here Eurypylus lies dead on the ground, with a spear protruding from his chest, and Neoptolemus chases Eurypylus's chariot, killing the charioteer. Apollo with drawn bow, strides to the right, protecting the dead body of Helicaon, which lies on the ground in front of him. Athena running, accompanied by her chariot, arrives from the right. A very similar scene depicted on the shoulder of another Attic black-figure hydria found at Vulci (Wurzburg L309), may also include Eurypylus. Philostratus the Younger (fl. 3rd century AD) describes a painting depicting the death of Eurypylus.

== Cult ==
According to the geographer Pausanias, although Eurypylus' father Telelphus was honored at the temple of Asclepius at Pergamon, because Eurypylus had slain Machaon, who was Asclepius's son, Eurypylus' name was never mentioned there.
