= Palaegambrium =

Town in ancient Greece

Palaegambrium or Palaigambrion (Ancient Greek: Παλαιγάμβριον, 'Old Gambrium') was a town of ancient Aeolis, close to Pergamum. Palaegambrium is first mentioned in the Hellenica of Xenophon which gives knowledge about the region in 399 BCE. At that time the ruler of the city, as well as of Gambrium, was Gorgion, son of Gongylos.

Its site is unlocated.
