= Myrina (Aeolis) =

Ancient Greek city

- Μυρίνα (Ancient Greek)
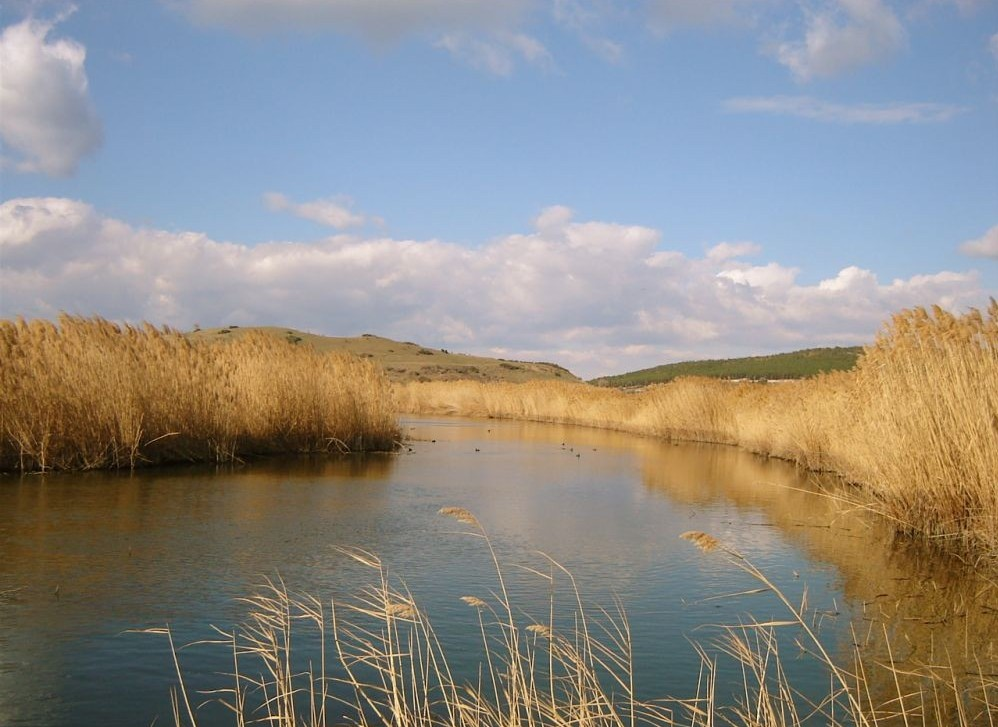
- Ancient Myrina was located on the Beriki Tepe hill, on the left bank of the Pytikos River.

- Location within Turkey
- 38°50′43″N 26°59′4″E
- Type: Settlement
- Associated with: Agathias
- Location: Aliağa, İzmir Province, Turkey
- Region: Mysia

Myrina (Ancient Greek: Μυρίνα) was one of the Aeolian cities on the western coast of Mysia, about 40 stadia to the southwest of Gryneion. The former bishopric is now a Latin Catholic titular see.

Its site is believed to be occupied by the modern Sandarlik at the mouth of the Koca Çay, near the town of Aliağa in İzmir Province, in the Aegean Region of Turkey, near Kalavasari.

== History ==
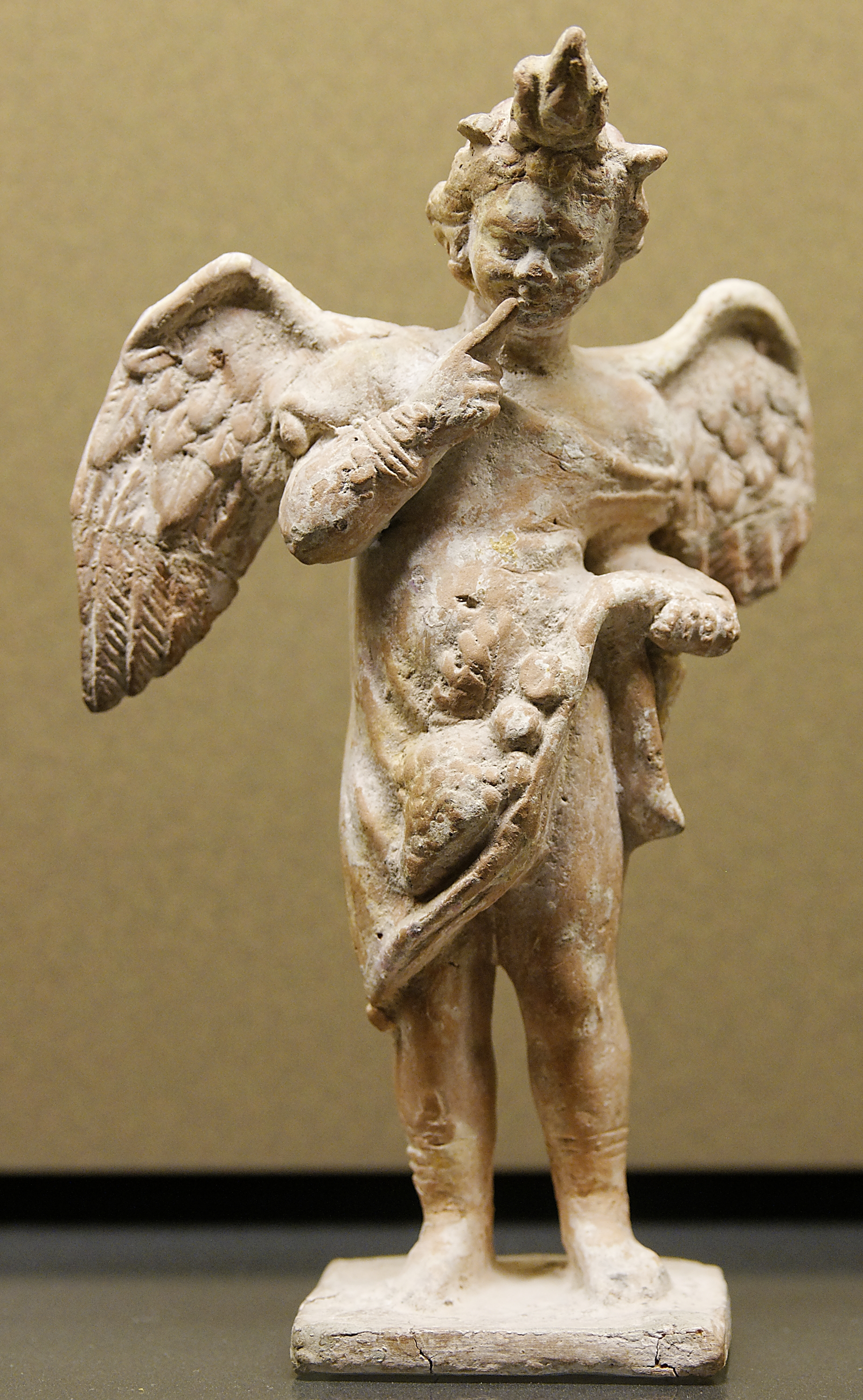
A terracotta figurine of a harpocratic Eros from Myrina, ca. 100–50 BC

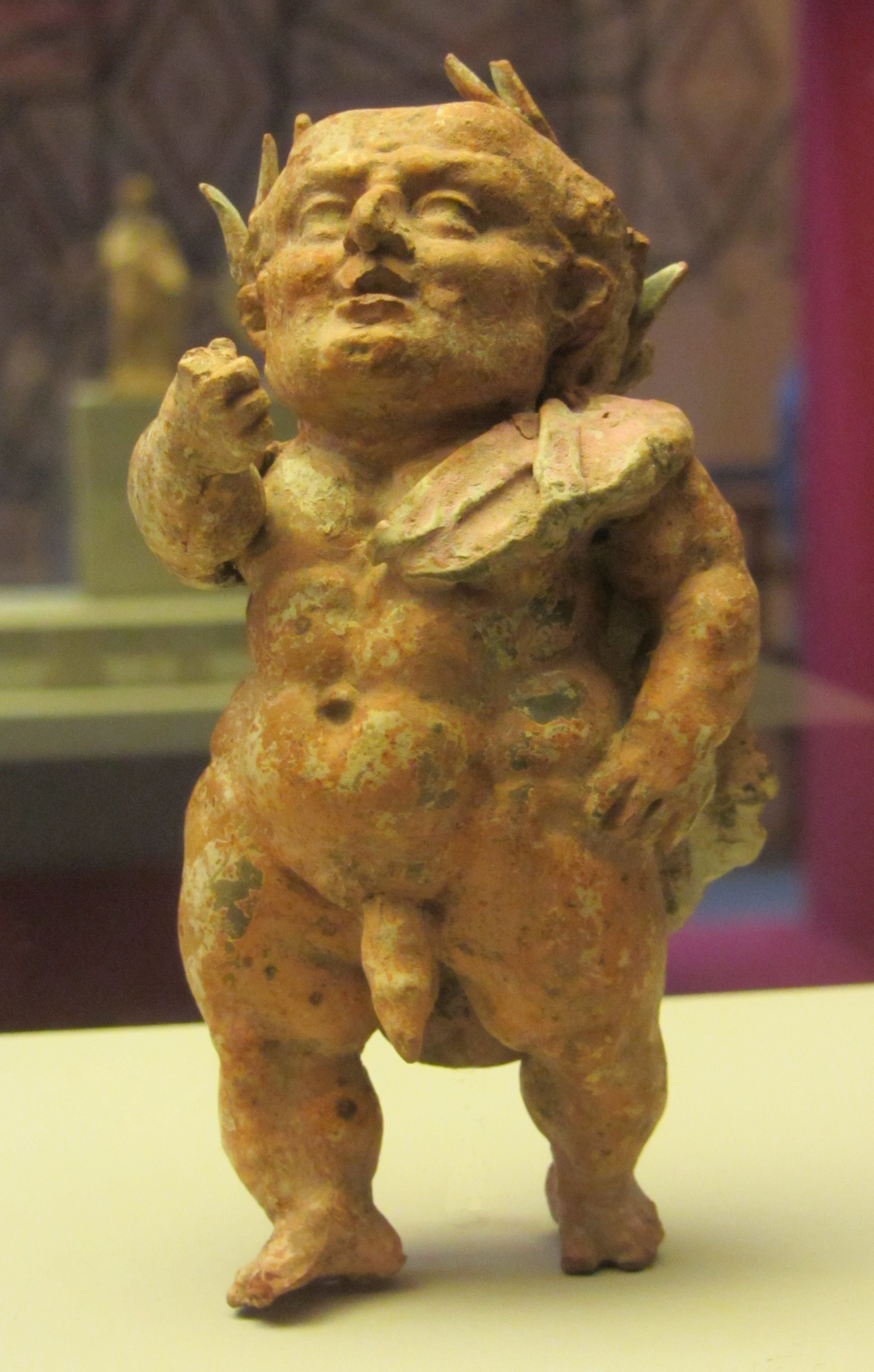
A terracotta figurine of a grotesque, 2nd-century BC. National Archaeological Museum, Athens.

It was said that the city was founded by one Myrinus before the other Aeolian cities, or by the Amazon Myrina. Artaxerxes gave Gryneium and Myrina to Gongylus, an Eretrian, who had been banished from his native city for favoring the interests of Persia.

Myrina was a very strong place, though not very large, and had a good harbor. Pliny the Elder mentions the fame of its oysters and that it bore the surname of Sebastopolis; while, according to Syncellus, it was also called Smyrna. An inscription (Bulletin de correspondance hellenique, V, 283) tells that Myrina formed part of the Attalid kingdom in the 3rd century BC. For some time Myrina was occupied by Philip V of Macedon; but the Romans compelled him to evacuate it, and declared the place free. Under Roman rule, Myrina was part of the Roman province of Asia Prima. It suffered severe earthquakes twice; first in the reign of Tiberius, on which occasion it received a remission of duties on account of the loss it had sustained, and a second time in the reign of Trajan. The town was restored each time, and continued to exist until a late period. It was the birthplace of Agathias, a Byzantine poet and historian of the 6th century. Myrina minted coins in Antiquity, some of which survive. Around 20 AD, Myrina minted a coin celebrating the betrothal of Claudius Drusus, son of the future emperor Claudius, to a daughter of Sejanus, commander of the Praetorian Guard under Tiberius.

== Remains ==
The site of Myrina was discovered at the mouth of the river that was the ancient Pythicos, whose alluvia have covered what was the city's harbour. Excavations (1880–1882) brought to light about four thousand tombs, dating from the last two centuries BC, in which were found numerous objects representing the divinities of the Greek pantheon; children's toys, reproductions of famous works, etc.: most of these may be seen today in the Museum of the Louvre. Archaeologist Dorothy Burr Thompson carried out a study of the 117 Hellenistic terracotta figures from Myrina in the Museum of Fine Arts, Boston.

== Ecclesiastical history ==
Under Roman rule, Myrina was part of the Roman province of Asia Prima and its bishopric was a suffragan of the capital's Metropolitan see of Ephesus. The names of some of its bishops are known: Dorotheus, 431 AD; Proterius, 451; John, 553; Cosmas, 787.

It still existed as a residential see in the 14th century, but was suppressed.

=== Titular see ===
It is now included in the Catholic Church's list of titular bishoprics, nominally restored in the 18th century.

It is vacant, having had the following incumbents, of the lowest (episcopal) rank:

- Matthaeus Prichard, Recollect Fathers (O.F.M. Rec.) (1713.09.20 – 1750.05.22)
- Karl Aloys von Königsegg und Rothenfels (1770.03.12 – 1796.02.24)
- John Ryan (1825.09.31 – 1828.03.17)
- Pietro India (1836.02.01 – 1837?)
- François-Alexis Rameaux (穆導沅), Vincentians (C.M.) (1838.12.11 – 1845.07.14)
- Pierre Lavaissière (石伯鐸), C.M. (1846.03.27 – 1849.12.19)
- Raffaele Bacchettoni (1880.12.13 – 1881)
- Giovanni Rosati (1882.03.30 – 1884.03.14)
- Joseph-André Boyer (包), Paris Foreign Missions Society (M.E.P.) (1886.04.13 – 1887.03.08)
- Isidorus Barriga (1890.06.26 – 1894?)
- Maximilian Gereon Graf von Galen (1895.07.16 – 1908.11.05)
- Joseph Gaudentius Anderson (1909.04.29 – 1927.07.02)
- Edward John Galvin (高爾文), Missionary Society of St. Columban (S.S.C.M.E., founder) (1927.07.14 – 1946.04.11), as first Apostolic Vicar of Hanyang (China); previously first Apostolic Prefect of Hanyang (November 1, 1924 – July 14, 1927), later first bishop of Hanyang (April 11, 1946 – February 23, 1956)
- Alfred-Jean-Félix Ancel, Prado (1947.02.17 – 1984.09.11)

== Notable residents ==
- Agathias, Byzantine historian and poet
