= Gryneium =

Ancient Greek settlement in Turkey

- Location within Turkey
- 38°52′28″N 27°4′9″E
- Type: Settlement
- Location: Yeni Şakran, İzmir Province, Turkey
- Region: Aeolis

Gryneium or Gryneum or Gryneion (Ancient Greek: Γρύνειον), also Grynium or Grynion (Γρύνιον), Grynia or Gryneia (Γρύνεια) and Grynoi (Γρῦνοι), was a city of ancient Aeolis. It was located 40 stadia from Myrina and 70 from Elaea. In early times it was independent, one of the 12 important cities of Aeolis, but afterwards became subject to Myrina. It contained a sanctuary of Apollo with an ancient oracle and a splendid temple of white marble. Because of the city Apollo derived the surname of Gryneus. Pausanias wrote that at Gryneium, where there was an amazing grove of Apollo, with cultivated trees, and all those which, although they bear no fruit, are pleasing to smell or look upon.

Servius records that the city was named for Grynus, son of Eurypylus and descendant of Heracles. With the help of Pergamus, he defended against neighboring kingdoms and founded the cities of Gryneium and Pergamum.

Xenophon mentions Gryneium as belonging to Gongylus of Eretria; and it is possible that the castrum Grunium in Phrygia, from which Alcibiades derived an income of 50 talents was the town of Grynium. It was a member of the Delian League.

In 334 BC, Parmenion, who was one of the commanders of Alexander the Great, came to the region before Alexander's invasion took the town by assault, burned it, and sold its inhabitants as slaves, to prevent the resistance of the people around.

Its ruins are near Aliağa in İzmir Province of Turkey in western Anatolia. It is on the Aegean coast and very close to the modern town of Yeni Şakran.

The first excavations were made by the French in 1883, lasting several days. They unearthed a few pieces of vase, and bronze objects. The next excavation was carried out by the Bergama Museum in 1959. During the expansion of İzmir–Çanakkale highway, a beautiful mosaic and necropolis area was found with sarcophagi. There has been no construction in the local area and the ruins can easily be seen from a great distance.
