= List of settlements in Argolis =

Multiple settlements

This is a list of settlements in Argolis, Greece.

- Achladokampos
- Adami
- Agia Triada
- Agios Adrianos
- Agios Dimitrios
- Agios Nikolaos
- Agrilitsa
- Alea
- Andritsa
- Anyfi
- Arachnaio
- Archaia Epidavros
- Argoliko
- Argos
- Aria
- Arkadiko
- Asini
- Asklipieio
- Borsas
- Dalamanara
- Didyma
- Dimaina
- Drepano
- Elliniko
- Ermioni
- Fichti
- Fournoi
- Fregkaina
- Frousiouna
- Gymno
- Iliokastro
- Inachos
- Ira
- Iraio
- Iria
- Kaparelli
- Karnezaiika
- Karya
- Kefalari
- Kefalovryso
- Kiveri
- Koilada
- Kourtaki
- Koutsopodi
- Kranidi
- Laloukas
- Lefkakia
- Limnes
- Lyrkeia
- Malantreni
- Manesis
- Midea
- Monastiraki
- Mykines
- Myloi
- Nafplio
- Nea Epidavros
- Nea Kios
- Nea Tiryntha
- Neo Iraio
- Neo Roeino
- Neochori
- Panaritis
- Portocheli
- Poullakida
- Prosymna
- Pyrgella
- Pyrgiotika
- Schinochori
- Skafidaki
- Skoteini
- Sterna
- Thermisia
- Tolo
- Tracheia
- Vrousti

== See also ==
- List of towns and villages in Greece
