= Kefalari (Argolis) =

Kefalari Κεφαλάρι
- Community
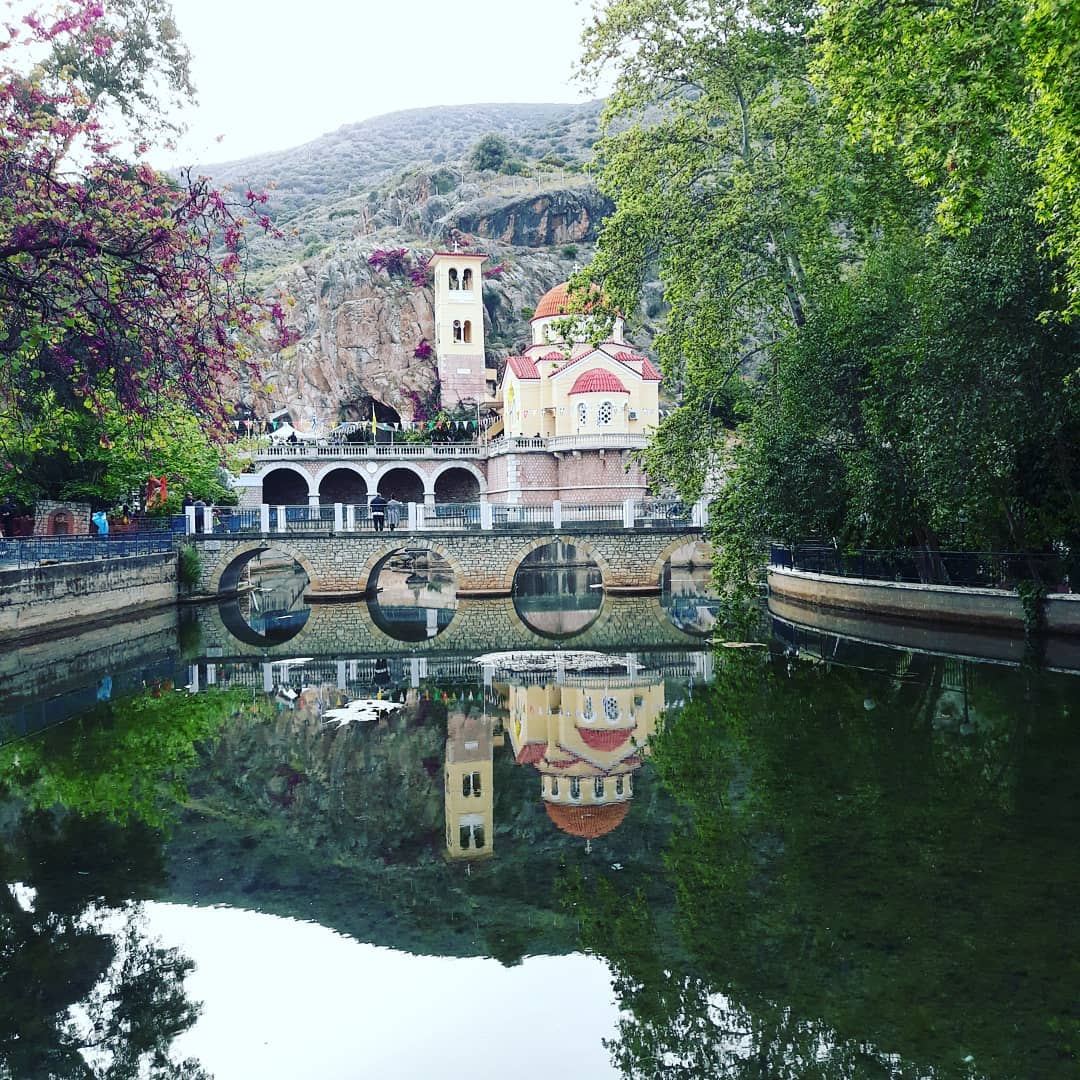
- Zoodochos Pigi church, Kefalari, Argolida, Greece

- Location within Greece
- Coordinates: 37°35′50″N 22°41′30″E
- Country: Greece
- Administrative region: Peloponnese
- Regional unit: Argolis
- Municipality: Argos-Mykines
- Municipal unit: Argos
- Elevation: 5 m (16 ft)

Population (2021)
  - Community: 839
- Time zone: UTC+2 (EET)
  - Summer (DST): UTC+3 (EEST)
- Postal code: 21250
- Area code: 2751
- Vehicle registration: AP

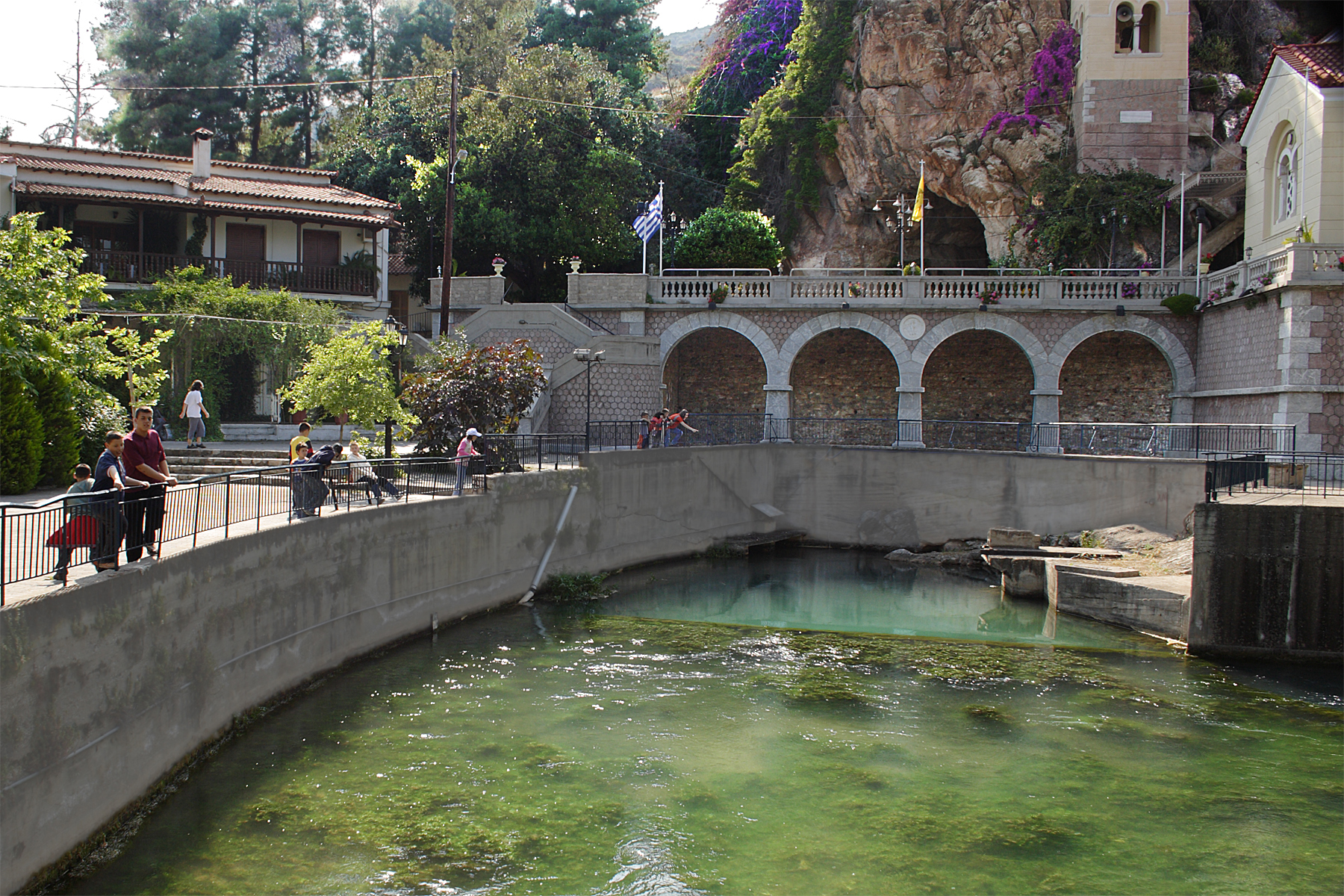
Very large karst spring Κεφαλάρι (in the hot season running dry

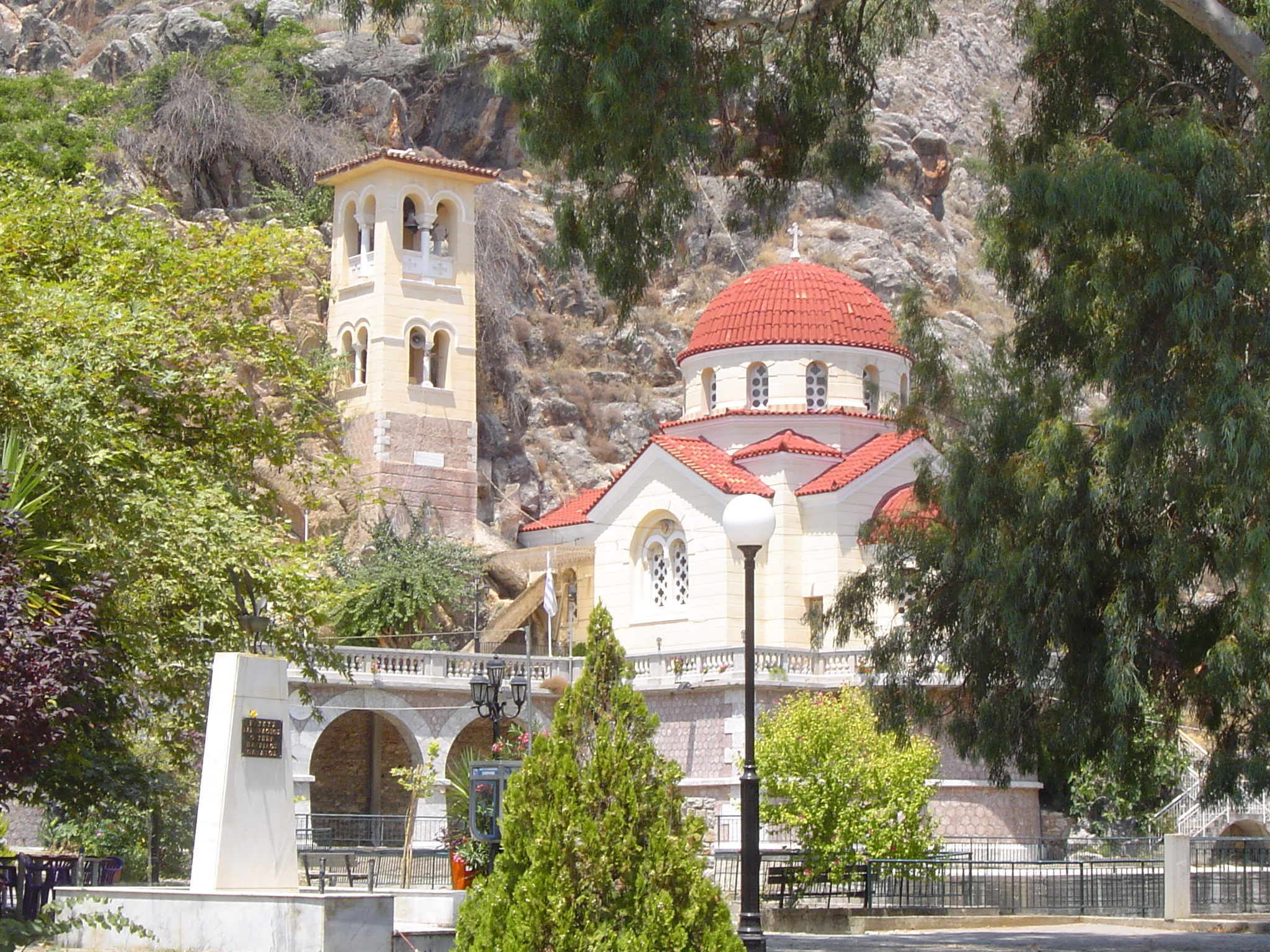
Orthodox church dedicated to the “Blessed Virgin Mary” above Kefalari karst spring “Zoodochos Pigi”

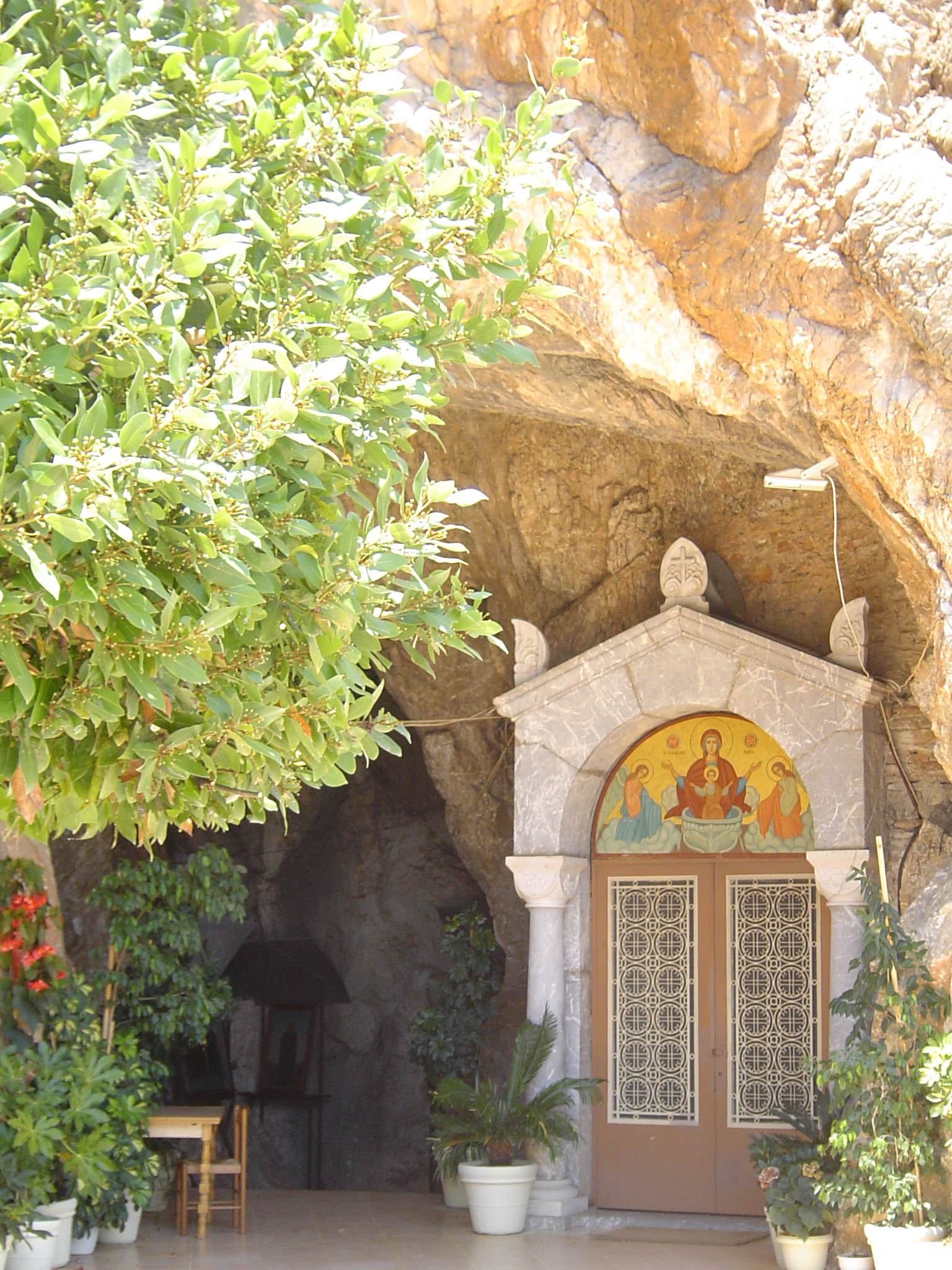
Entrance to pilgrimage karst cave

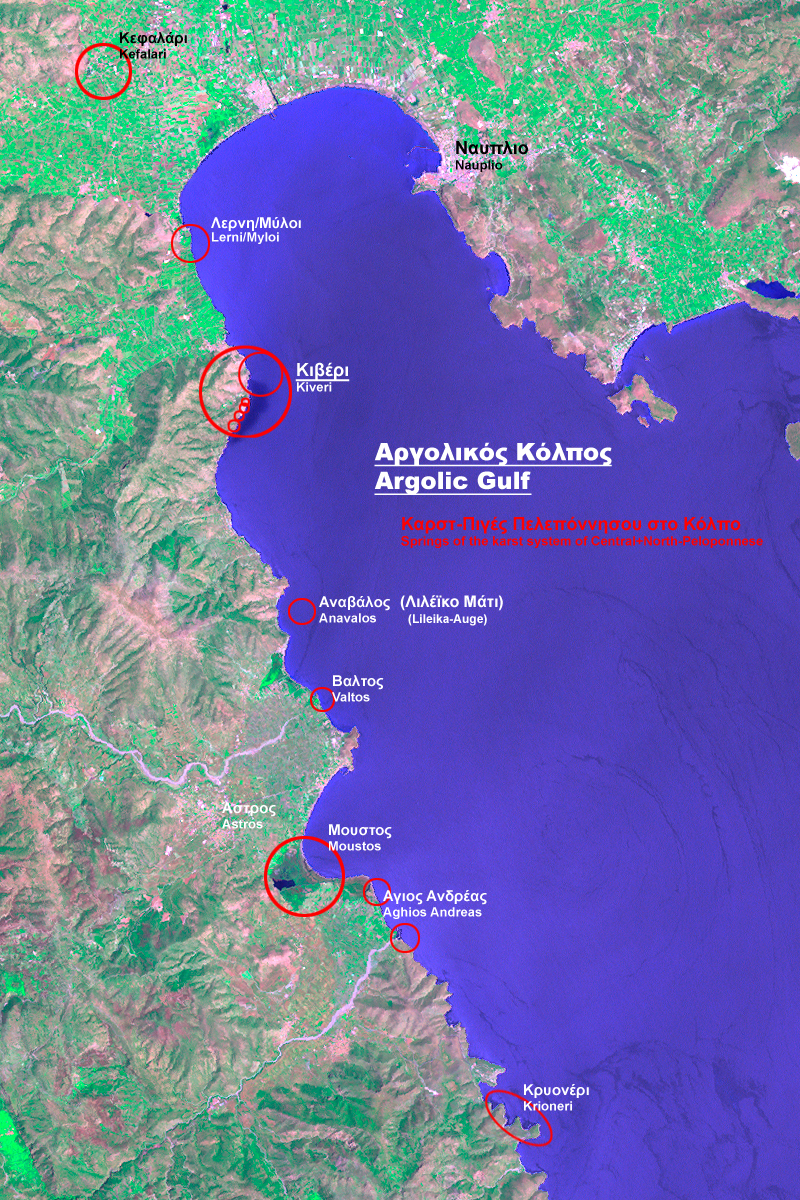
Chain of karst springs at Argolic Gulf

Kefalari (Greek: Κεφαλάρι, spring or lit. gushing abundant water) is the name of the village and community in Argolis. The village is located southwest of Argos, Peloponnese. The village developed around a large geologically significant karst spring. In the mythology and the life of ancient Greeks this spring was of importance and today it is a place of orthodox pilgrimage.

== History ==
Mythology describes how Hercules eliminated the mythical monster Hydra (Λερναία Ύδρα/ Lernaia Hydra) near the region Lerni, in modern-day Myloi (Argolis) during his second labor. After that, Hercules buried the main head of the Hydra above a small mountain named Chaon (Argolis) and since then a large spring mushroomed, providing water in abundance to the people of Argos. The actual meaning of Kefalari (Κεφαλάρι) derives from the words αἴρω + κεφάλι (lift/cut + head) taken from the mythical fight of Hercules and Hydra. Kefalari was probably established as a religious place for the ancient Hellenic religion, in what was thought to be the place where Hercules buried the head of the Hydra. Its ceremonial practices concerned about the worship of the goddess Hera and minor deities such as nymphs or serpents, with connection to that specific labor of Hercules. A village then sprung near the various religious sites. Kefalari was an integral part of the ancient city-state of Argos. There is little or no archaeological evidence if the settlement was occasionally inhabited for religious purposes or was the primary home to anyone at all.

In later antiquity and Medieval/Byzantine times Christendom replaced the worship of Hera with the worship of Zoodochos Pigi (the life-giving fountain, meaning the Mother of Jesus, Mary). From 337 till mid 13th century Kefalari belonged to the Byzantine Empire, until French as well as Italian knights and mercenaries conquered Peloponnese for their own as a result of the 4th Crusade in 1204 AD. In the 15th century, Kefalari under Byzantine control again until the Ottoman Turks conquered Peloponnese in 1460 AD.

In the 16th and 17th centuries, Peloponnese changed hands between the Serene Republic of Venice and the Ottoman Empire as a result of the Ottoman-Venetian wars. Then Peloponnese fell into Ottoman hands in 1715 AD and formed the Eyalet of Morea (ایالت موره, Eyālet-i Mōrâ). During Ottoman occupation, Peloponnese (or Morea, as widely known by the locals and foreigners) thrived economically and socially, and many villages were established or reestablished; Kefalari was one of the hundreds of villages that prospered for that short period.

In 1780 AD, Peloponnese was turned into a wasteland as a result of the Orlofika revolt and Kefalari was deserted by its inhabitants. After the disastrous revolt, most its former inhabitants moved to Arcadia or eastern Argolis which are mountainous and inaccessible regions. After the Greek war of independence in 1821, Kefalari was a tiny village belonging to the municipality of Argos. In the late 1880s, people who were either descendants of the former persecuted villagers or newcomers started inhabiting Kefalari and created a small thriving community in which animal husbandry, farming and tapestry were the main sources of income. After WW2, from the 1950s to the 1970s, Kefalari thrived in the agricultural and structural sector along with the rest of Peloponnese due to the exceptional infrastructure and economic measures established by the Greek state.

Modern-day Kefalari is a village of no more than 1000 people, and is a popular vacation spot. Kefalari is also a place for Orthodox pilgrimage and the main holiday is celebrated on the Thursday after Orthodox Easter during which there is a large fair.

== Geography ==
Kefalari is a small community with about 800 residents in the municipality of Argos-Mykines on the peninsula Peloponnese. Argos, the next larger city and seat of the municipality, is approximately 6 km (3.7 miles) from Kefalari. Here, where the carbonate mountains end and the fertile “Plain of Argos” begins, large quantities of water, from subterranean waterways, emerge from a large karst spring. The karst water runs in the river Erasinos (in ancient times a river god) towards the sea to the Argolic Gulf at the village of Nea Kios. The Kefalari spring's outlet is framed by walls and rows of Platanus trees.

Rivers and springs as locations of fresh water played a vital role in Greece at all times – in ancient Greek mythology these locations were the manifestation of gods. Well-kept styled fountains were central points and sources of community life and identification, and are still vivid symbols especially in rural tradition throughout Greece. In Kefalari there is a cave approximately 60 m (200 ft) above the karst spring, today decorated and dedicated to the Blessed Virgin Mary. The cave, spring ("Zoodochos Pigi"), and an orthodox church became a center for worship of the "Panagia Kefalariotissa". The church, with foundations dating back to Roman emperors, was reconstructed at its present dominating location in 1835. Today Kefalari is a place of pilgrimage, especially for the nearby Nea Kios.

About 2 km (1.2 miles) west of the village there is the Pyramid of Kefalari archeological site; one of two ancient sites with remnants of a pyramidal stone construction in Greece, both in Argolis. The Pyramid of Kefalari has a base of 7–9 m (23–30 ft).

== Geology and Hydrogeology ==
Most of the water of the karst spring, as well as of other springs close to or directly at the Argolic Gulf, originates from ponors (in Greece Καταβόθρες) in poljes of the arcadic highland (big Tripoli basin, Argon Pedion) and of the highlands of Corinthia and Argolis (Lake Stymphalia, Alea, Argolis/Skoteini). Common knowledge in hydrogeology says, karst waters of mountainous karst land emerge to the surface right at borders where there are impermeable sediments - in this case, the fertile “Plain of Argos”. The sediments grew up by fluvial sedimentation and/or a falling water level of the Argolic Gulf (in geological periods).

An elaborate geological/hydrogeological study carried out by an international group of scientists analyzed hydrogeological structures of extended terrains of Acadia, Corinthia and Argolis. An enormous number of katavothres (ponors) in closed basins of highlands, hydro-tectonical structures of faults were mapped, which allow subterranean waterways directed towards the Argolic Gulf. The distribution of the karst waters flowing to various springs at the Argolic Gulf was mapped in detail and backed up by numerous chemical and physical dye tracing tests in 1983 and 1984.

As rivers and springs always played a vital role for ancient Greeks – mythologically and in their everyday life – it is not surprising, that a water connection between Lake Stymphalia and spring Kefalari was already assumed in ancient times. According to the above-mentioned scientific study of Morfis et.al., dye tracing tests for Kefalari confirmed a water connection coming from the polje of Skafidia (a small polje belonging to the Feneos-Corintia-Complex and a water connection coming from the Argolis polje Alea/Skoteini to Kefalari.

While the submarine karst spring at Kiveri (with its largest discharge at the Argolic Gulf) flows permanently, Kefalari's spring discharge varies between very much and nill (in the dry period). According to the Morfis study, the cave above the spring “corresponds to a former karst level”. After collecting the water of the Kiveri spring by a wall cage in 1972 and finishing a ca. 30 km long concrete irrigation channel for the “Plain of Argos”, Kefalari's spring got “additional water from the spring Kiveri. Until February 1983 the spring water also served as the drinking water supply in Argos. This is no longer possible, because of bad water quality.

== Literature ==
- Smith, William, ed. (1854–1857). "Argos". Dictionary of Greek and Roman Geography. London: John Murray.
- Richard Speich: Südgriechenland. Kunst- und Reiseführer, Band 2 Peloponnes, Stuttgart u. a. (Kohlhammer) 1980, ISBN 3-17-005395-7, S. 119
- Lambert Schneider: Peloponnes. Mykenische Paläste, antike Heiligtümer und venezianische Kastelle in Griechenlands Süden, Köln (DuMont) 2001, ISBN 3-7701-4599-2, S. 178
- Morfis, A. (Athens), Zojer, H. (Graz). Karst Hydrogeology of the Central and Eastern Peloponnesus (Greece). Steirische Beiträge zur Hydrogeologie 37/38. 301 pages, Graz 1986
