= Limnes, Argolis =

Village in Argolis, Greece

Limnes Λίμνες
- Village
- View of the village from Bourbouniari

- Location within Greece
- Coordinates: 37.71408°N 22.88023°E
- Country: Greece
- Region: Peloponnese
- Regional unit: Argolis
- Municipality: Argos-Mykines
- Municipal unit: Mykines

Population (2021)
  - Total: 553

Limnes (Greek: Λίμνες) is a village in Argolis, Greece. It forms a community of the municipality of Argos-Mykines, within the municipal unit of Mykines. The village had 553 permanent residents at the 2021 Greek census.

== Geography and economy ==
Limnes is a mountain village on a limestone upland. The hillslopes around the village are covered with dry-stone agricultural terraces. In 1988 a survey team found that essentially all gentle slopes below about 600 m, around 80% of the surface around Limnes, were terraced. Only about 30% of the terraced fields were in use at any one time, and most of those were planted with tobacco rather than grain. The survey's final publication suggests that large-scale terracing on the high limestone hills probably dates from the 14th century. In the wider Berbati–Limnes region, pastoralism was a significant economic activity until the early 20th century, when tobacco became a cash crop. Livestock farming became the main local occupation again after tobacco cultivation was abandoned.

== History ==
=== Prehistory and antiquity ===
The mountains around Limnes were investigated by the Berbati–Limnes Archaeological Survey, a surface survey carried out in 1988–1990 by the Swedish Institute at Athens in the Berbati Valley and the upland area around Limnes. The survey recovered a few stone tools of the Greek Mousterian (Middle Paleolithic) industry from the slopes of Viglatouri mountain, north of Limnes; the authors suggested that they could have been dropped by hunting parties.

The earliest settlement in the Limnes uplands recorded by the survey dates to the Final Neolithic (roughly the fourth millennium BC). The most significant concentration of Final Neolithic material is at a settlement on the summit of Kathili, a low limestone hill in the Miyio valley northeast of Limnes, where surveyors recorded andesite querns, stone celts and plentiful pottery sherds; a small number of sherds there date to the Early Helladic II period. The survey team interpreted such Final Neolithic and Early Helladic sites as connected with pastoralism and trade, possibly special-purpose locations used by herders.

In the Late Bronze Age, Mycenaean activity in the Limnes uplands was limited to the same hill at Kathili, which overlooks a pass; the survey team suggested that it may have housed a small community of shepherds or a small garrison asserting Mycenaean control of the area. The area saw little later activity before the Middle Ages, although the survey identified a fortress on Vigliza hill among its Classical-period findspots.

=== Middle Ages ===
According to the survey, the Limnes uplands were not resettled until the 12th–13th centuries AD. The main medieval settlement was in the Miyio valley, at a site known locally as Katalima or Katalimni, where surveyors found building foundations, at least two chapels and large numbers of sherds, including pottery kiln wasters indicating local pottery production, as well as iron slag. A preliminary examination dated the pottery mainly to the 12th–14th centuries. The survey authors considered the settlement probably contemporary with the castle at Ayionori, which controlled the passes between the Argive plain and Corinthia. Local informants told them that the village was abandoned after the Greek War of Independence, and its buildings were later dismantled to build the terraces that now cover the site.

=== Ottoman period and early modern era ===
Around 1400, Albanian-speaking settlers were granted passage into the Peloponnese; the Swedish Institute at Athens notes that many probably settled in the Berbati–Limnes area, as indicated by the fact that Arvanitika was spoken there by the elderly until very recently. After a period of depopulation, the Berbati, Limnes and Miyio valleys were repopulated during the 18th century, dominated by the villages of Prosimna and Limnes and under the control of Corinth. In 1833, Limnes had a population of 859, compared with 236 in Berbati.

== Language and traditions ==
Limnes is one of the Arvanite villages of Argolis, where Arvanitika has traditionally been spoken.

The village celebrates the feast of the Presentation of Christ on 2 February. Its central church is dedicated to the feast, and traditional singing and dancing form part of the celebrations.

== Population ==
Permanent population
Census year	Population
1991	1,058
2001	898
2011	734
2021	553

== See also ==
- List of settlements in Argolis
- Berbati Valley
