= Adami =

Adami may refer to:

- Adami (surname)
- Adami, a town in the Bible (or Adami-nekeb)
- Adami (car), Italian automobile manufacture
- Adami (Argolis), a mountainous village in Argolis, Greece

== See also ==
- Winn Adami, the duplicitous Bajoran woman who became Kai in the science fiction television series Star Trek: Deep Space Nine
