= Sterna (disambiguation) =

Sterna is a genus of seabirds.

Sterna may also refer to:

- Sterna, the plural of sternum, the breastbone
- Sterna, Argolis, Greece
- Sterna, Drama, Greece
- Sterna, Evros, Greece
- Sterna Island, a small island off Graham Land, Antarctic Peninsula
