= Monastiraki (disambiguation) =

Monastiraki is a flea market in Greece.

Monastiraki may also refer to:

- Monastiraki, Argolis
- Monastiraki, Crete, an ancient Minoan town on Crete
- Monastiraki station, interchange station of the Athens Metro
