= Inachos (river) =

Location
- Country: Greece

Physical characteristics
- Source
  - location: Argolis, Greece
- Mouth
  - location: Argolic Gulf, Aegean Sea
  - coordinates: 37°35′8″N 22°44′57″E
- Length: 42 km (26 mi)
- Basin size: 537.5 km^{2} (207.5 sq mi)

The Inachos (Greek: Ίναχος), also known as Panitsa (Πάνιτσα), is a river in the Peloponnese, southern Greece. Its source is in the mountains of western Argolis, near the village of Kaparelli. It flows into the Argolic Gulf of the Aegean Sea near Nea Kios. The river was named after Inachus, a mythical king of Argos, who, according to Greek mythology, introduced civilization to the area.

According to Pausanias (ii 25.3, 8.6.6), the Inachus rises in Mt. Artemisium, on the borders of Arcadia, or, according to Strabo (viii. p.370), in Mt. Lyrceium, a northern offshoot of Artemisium. Near its sources it receives a tributary called the Cephissus, which rises in Mt. Lyrceium (Strab. ix. p.424; Aelian, Ael. VH 2.33.)

The river flows in a south-easterly direction, east of the city of Argos, into the Argolic Gulf. The river is often dry during the summer. Between it and the city of Argos is the mountain torrent named Charadrus, which also rises in Mt. Artemisium and which, because of its proximity to Argos, has frequently been mistaken for the Inachus by modern travellers. It flows over a wide gravelly bed, which is generally dry in summer, whence its modern name Xerias ("dry river"). It flows into the Inachus a little below Argos.

It was on the banks of the Charadrus that the armies of Argos, on their return from military expeditions, were obliged to undergo a court of inquiry before they were permitted to enter the city. (Thuc. 5.60; comp. Paus. 2.25.2; Leake, Morea, vol. ii. p. 364, Peloponnesiaca, p. 267; Mure, vol. ii. p. 161.)

== Sources ==
- William Smith. Dictionary of Greek and Roman Geography (1854). s.v. Argos
