= Tolo Bay =

Tolo Bay or the Bay of Tolo may refer to either of:

- Bay of Tolo in Indonesia (Indonesian: Teluk Tolo), between the eastern and southeastern peninsulas of Sulawesi
- Bay of Tolo or Tolon in Greece (Ancient Greek: Τολόν or Modern Greek: Τολό), part of the Argolic Gulf between the Argolid and the main Peleponnese
