= Temenium =

Town in ancient Argolis (Greece)

Coordinates: 37°34′54″N 22°44′16″E

Temenium or Temenion (Τημένιον), a town in ancient Argolis, at the upper end of the Argolic Gulf, which according to Greek mythology was built by Temenus, the son of Aristomachus. It was 50 stadia from Nauplia, and 26 from Argos. The river Phrixus flowed into the sea between Temenium and Lerna. Pausanias visited Temenium in the 2nd century, and saw two temples of Poseidon and Aphrodite and the tomb of Temenus.

Its site is located near the modern Nea Kios.

== History ==
During the Dorian invasion of the Peloponnese, Dorian forces led by the Heracleidae gained possession of the coast near Argos and founded Temenium before conquering Argos itself.
