= Xerias =

Xerias (Greek: Ξερίας) may refer to:

- Xerias (Argolis), a river of Argolis, Greece
- Xerias (Euboea), a river of Euboea, Greece
- Xerias, former name of Titarisios, a river of Thessaly, Greece
