= Agrilitsa, Argolis =

Agrilitsa Αγριλίτσα
- Community
- Location within Greece
- Coordinates: 37°37′27″N 22°35′48″E
- Country: Greece
- Administrative region: Peloponnese
- Regional unit: Argolis
- Municipality: Argos-Mykines
- Municipal unit: Lyrkeia
- Village established: 1952
- Elevation: 280 m (920 ft)

Population (2021)
  - Community: 98
- Time zone: UTC+2 (EET)
  - Summer (DST): UTC+3 (EEST)
- Postal code: 212 00

Agrilitsa is a semi-mountainous village of the regional unit of Argolis in the Peloponnese. It is located at a height of 280 meters and is built on the valley of Xerias in the foothils of Mount Artemisio. Several tributaries of the river Xerias run through the village. In the Greek census of 2021 it had a permanent population of 98 people and it is the main settlement of the local community of Karya. The main church of the village is the Church of the Annunciation, but several chapels can also be found in the area.

Agrilitsa was once the winter village of the inhabitants of Karya who moved their flocks from the high pastures of Mount Artemisio to the lowlands of Agrilitsa at the end of every October, only to return there in May. It was first recognized as a separate settlement in 1952 and since then it has become the main settlement in the area. The village has an active elementary school and several businesses, mostly related to the local olive oil and dairy/cheese production.

The climate is typical hot-summer Mediterranean with warm, dry summers and cool, wet winters and is similar to that of Argos.

At a close proximity we can find the settlements of Stravi Rachi, Galati, Galanaiika, Spanaiika, Merkouri, Frengaina and Mazi (Aria).

== Population ==
Historical population
| Year | Pop. | ±% |
|---|---|---|
| 1951 | 200 | — |
| 1961 | 331 | +65.5% |
| 1971 | 188 | −43.2% |
| 1981 | 160 | −14.9% |
| 1991 | 164 | +2.5% |
| 2001 | 56 | −65.9% |
| 2011 | 149 | +166.1% |
| 2021 | 98 | −34.2% |

The population has remained stable for several decades, showing many ups and downs without a clear trend.
