= Dimitris Kamposos =

Greek politician

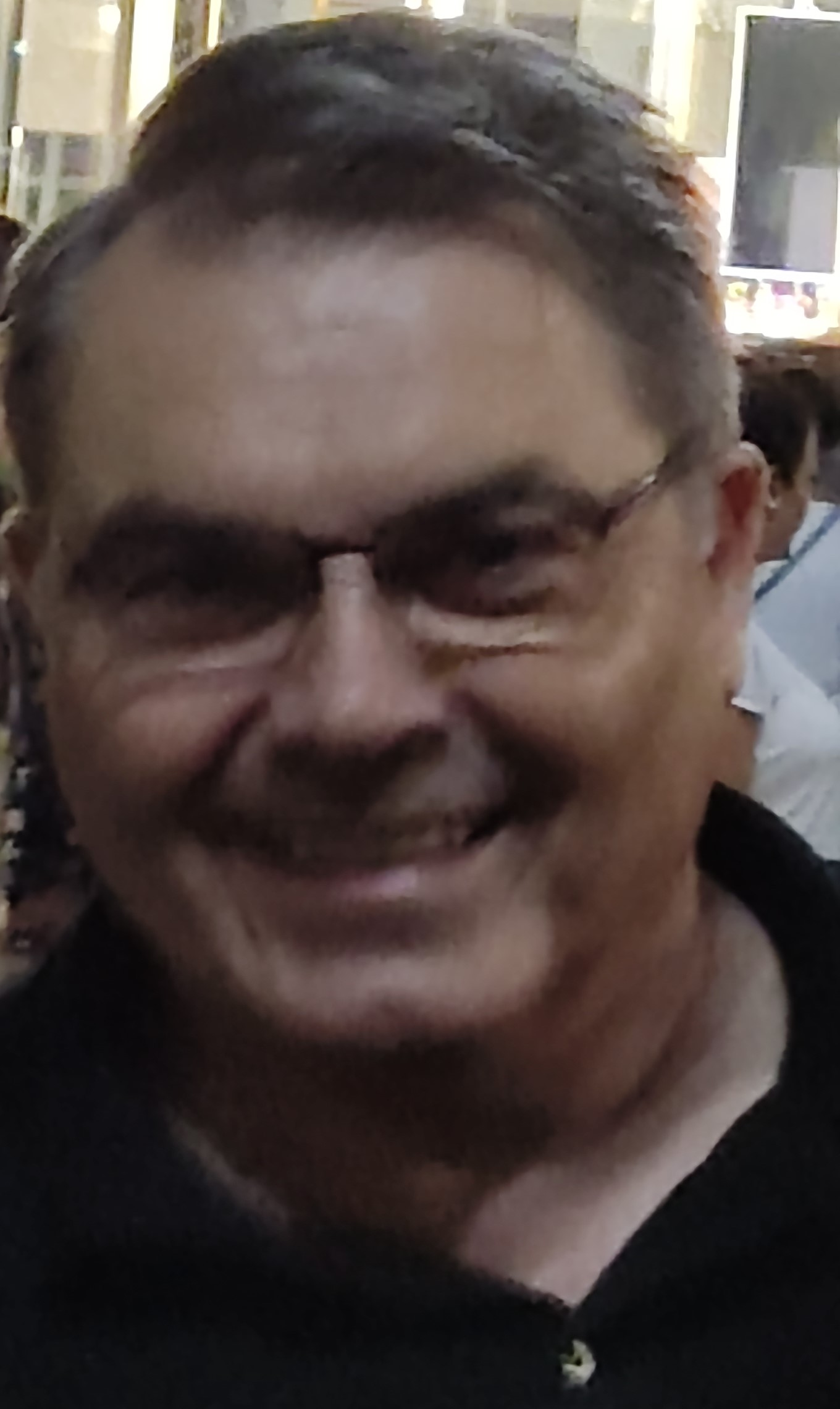
Dimitris Kamposos in 2023

Dimitris Kamposos (born in Argos) is a Greek politician. A member of New Democracy, he was the previous mayor of Argos-Mykines.

On 8 June 2018, he was expelled from New Democracy for supporting the beating of mayor of Thessaloniki Yiannis Boutaris, posting "this is the fate of TRAITORS", referring to the victim's support for the Prespa Agreement, and antisemitic comments, saying "I bother Boutaris, the favourite of the Jews" and "he wears the cap. Because I don't wear the cap [...] everyone has to attack me".

On 19 July 2023, Kyriakos Mitsotakis decided to add him back into the party.
