= Xerias (Argolis) =

Seasonal watercourse of Argolis, Greece

- Native name: Ξεριάς (Greek)

Location
- Country: Greece

Physical characteristics
- Mouth
  - location: Inachos
  - coordinates: 37°38.811′N 22°43.68′E

Basin features
- Progression: Inachos→ Aegean Sea

The Xerias, (Greek: Ξεριάς, from ξερός, "dry") is an arroyo in the Argolid in Greece. Its ancient name was Charadros (Χάραδρος), which is still used, although its Demotic name is by far the most common and used on modern maps. (Note: This Charadros is not to be confused with the Charadros in Achaea, nor should its modern name be confused with the Xerias in Thessaly nor the Xerias River that flows through Corinth (also known as the Leukon).) Under its ancient name, it is described in Pausanias's Description of Greece (2.25.2).

== Geology and hydrology ==
The Xerias rises in the Parnon massif at Mount Ktenias in Arcadia and flows east to Argos, where it forms the northern boundary of the city, and then turns south and winds around the city's east side before turning east again. It is generally dry in the summer, although flash floods can occur during storms. It meets the Inachos east of the city, from whence the Inachos flows into the Argolic Gulf at Nea Kios, but an interlocking spur continues east and winds around the village of Merbaka.

== Water management ==
The natural flow of the Xerias has been modified by river engineering, including the creation of pumping stations and reservoirs to control seasonal flooding, improve sanitation, and provide more stable water supplies for agricultural and human use. Periodic flash floods in the area have resulted in bridge scour that has destroyed bridges, roadways and other infrastructure and property in the vicinity of Argos. Serious floods occurred eight times between 1967 and 1997, and recent news reports confirm ongoing problems with flooding in 2014-15.

In the wake of catastrophic flooding, there has been disagreement over whether the reservoirs or the practice of filling in of ditches and the planting of citrus trees too close to the river has caused increased flooding, with competing local interests often pointing the finger at the other, and academics and government officials divided on the subject of how best to control the flooding.

In addition, some scientists are of the opinion that the removal of wetlands near the mouth of the Xerias to control the spread of mosquitoes and malaria has paradoxically increased area water use in winter because a changing microclimate due to wetlands removal has increased the incidence of frost on local farmers' citrus trees (sprinklers are used to prevent frost build-up). Agronomists are also concerned that increased reliance on groundwater in winter does not give aquifers a chance to replenish, and could lead to aquifer depletion.

== Strategic importance ==
Because of its strategic location, forming a moat along the border of Argos, the river has been the site of important battles in classical and modern times.

=== Ancient ===
In ancient times, a road led from the Deiras Gate on the north side of the city to Mantinea, and a temple to Ares and Aphrodite was situated along this road, outside the city walls but south of the river. Argive military officers were required to give a report of their conduct here before returning to the city, possibly at a nearby amphitheatre, and sacrifices and religious ceremonies relating to the military were conducted at the temple.

In 235 BC, the Charadros was the site of a battle between the forces of Aratus of Sicyon, who was born at Argos and was desirous of liberating the city, and the Macedonian-backed Argive tyrant Aristippus of Argos. The battle was fought to a draw, with Aratus being wounded and retreating back to his fortified camp on one flank, while the other wing of his army routed the forces of Aristippus on the other flank and drove them back to the river. Aratus negotiated the withdrawal of his forces to the north; later, Aristippus would be killed at the battle of Cleonae.

=== Modern ===
On April 25, 1821, the Xerias became the site of a battle between Greek forces and Turks for control of Argos, led by Mustafa, deputy (kehya bey) to the absentee Turkish governor of the Morea, Hurshid Pasha. Mustafa's army included a large contingent of Turkish-allied Cham Albanians under Elmez Aga. The Greeks in the town were led by a triumvirate of Paparsenis Krestas, Demetrios Tsorkis, and Ioannis Yiannouzas, the eldest son of admiral Laskarina Bouboulina. Yiannouzas was slain, along with about 700 other Greeks, including civilians, and according to local accounts, many women and girls were captured by the Turks and sold into slavery. Many of the Greek casualties were inflicted by Turkish artillery fire from across the Xerias.

Afterwards, the Turkish forces moved on Nafplio and then to reinforce the Turkish garrison at Tripoli, which was being besieged by the Greeks. Despite their superior numbers and having taken the towns of Nafplio and Argos, the Turks could not or would not take their citadels, possibly due to Mustafa's orders to hurry to the relief of Tripoli, and partly due to problems with his guns, which were suitable for anti-personnel operations but not the reduction of the strong Venetian-engineered fortifications in the Peloponnese. The Turks brought thirty artillery pieces with them and trained gunners, but the artillery seems to have been of sub-standard quality and by the end of the Siege of Tripoli, only seven pieces were found to be in working order.
