= Sterna, Argolis =

Sterna Στέρνα
- Community
- Location within Greece
- Coordinates: 37°43′N 22°36′E
- Country: Greece
- Administrative region: Peloponnese
- Regional unit: Argolis
- Municipality: Argos-Mykines
- Municipal unit: Lyrkeia

Population (2021)
  - Community: 122
- Time zone: UTC+2 (EET)
  - Summer (DST): UTC+3 (EEST)

Sterna (Greek: Στέρνα) is a small village in Argolis, Peloponnese, Greece. It is part of the municipal unit Lyrkeia.
