= Ancient pyramid =

Pyramid in the context of ancient architecture primarily refers to the Egyptian pyramids (see List of Egyptian pyramids). Various other structures built in antiquity have also been called pyramids:

- Mesoamerican step pyramids; see Mesoamerican pyramids
- Chinese pyramids
- Mesopotamian Ziggurats
- The Nubian pyramids, Sudan
- The Pyramid of Hellinikon, Greece
- The Pyramid of Gaius Cestius, Porta San Paolo, Rome
- The Star Pyramid or Pulemelei Mound, Samoa
- The Peruvian Pyramids

== See also ==
- Lepsius list of pyramids
- Pyramidology
- Pyramid (disambiguation)
- French pyramids (modern structures)
- The Pyramids of Güímar (modern structures)
- "Bosnian pyramids" (not man-made structures)
