= Greek pyramids =

Ancient monuments in Greece

Coordinates: 37°35′14″N 22°40′17″E

- Ελληνικές πυραμίδες
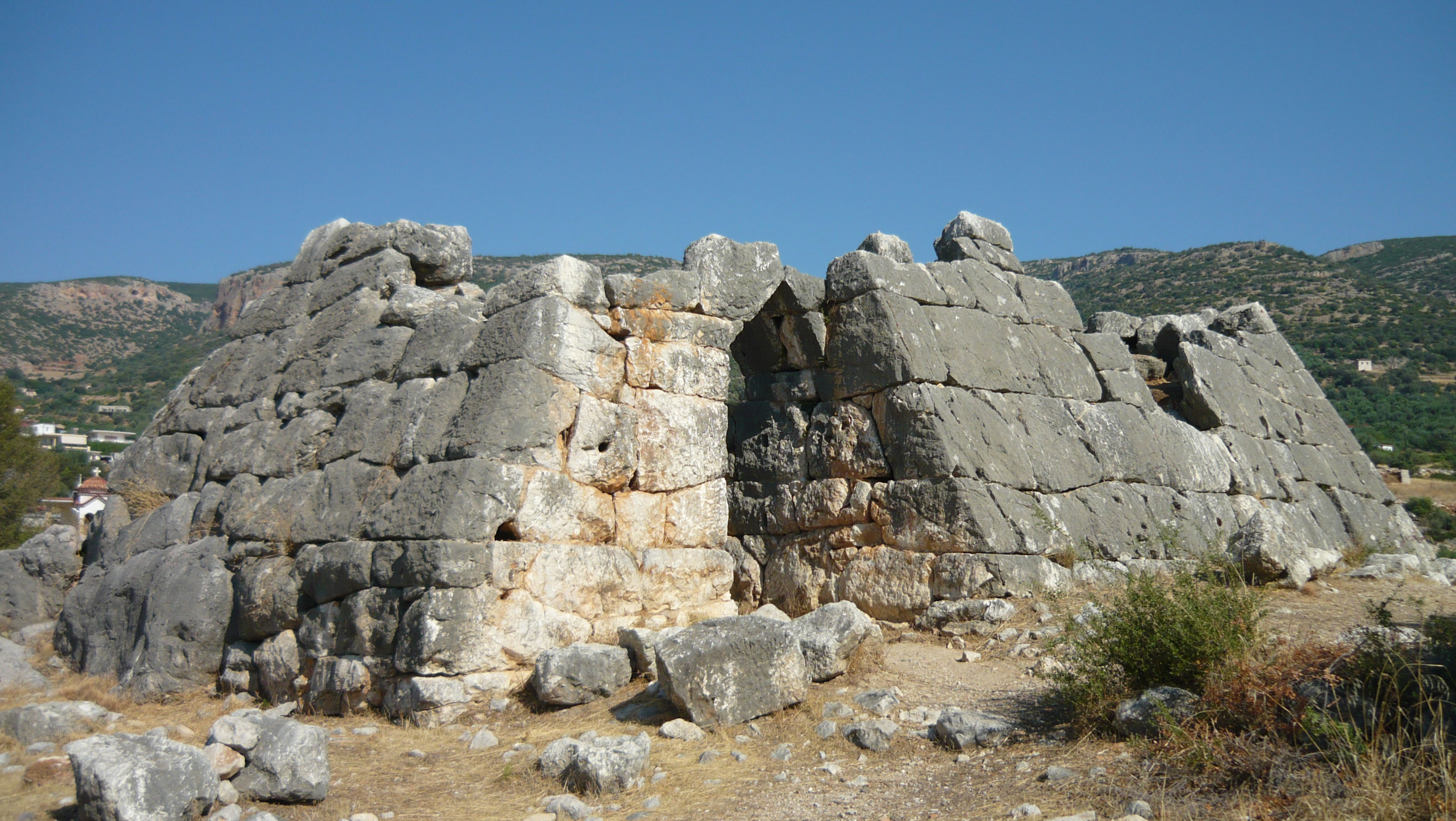
- The Pyramid of Hellenikon
- Interactive map of Greek pyramids
- Location: Argolis, Greece
- Type: Pyramids
- Material: Limestone
- Completion date: 2500–460 BC (debatable)

Greek pyramids, also known as the Pyramids of Argolis, refers to several ancient structures located in the plains of Argolid, Greece. The best known of these is known as the Pyramid of Hellinikon (Greek: Πυραμίδα του Ελληνικού). During the time of the geographer Pausanias it was considered to be a tomb. Twentieth century researchers have suggested other possible uses. The surrounding country of Apobathmi was termed Pyramia (Πυράμια), from the monuments in the form of pyramids found there.

== Background ==
In addition to at least two pyramids which no longer exist, there are two surviving pyramid-like structures, the Pyramid of Hellinikon and another at Lygourio, a village near the Ancient Theatre of Epidaurus.

At the southeastern edge of the plain of Argos, near the springs of river Erasinos (spring of Kefalari) and on the main arterial road which during antiquity led from Argos to Tegea and the rest of Arcadia and Kynouria, there is a small structure extant known as the Pyramid of Hellenikon.

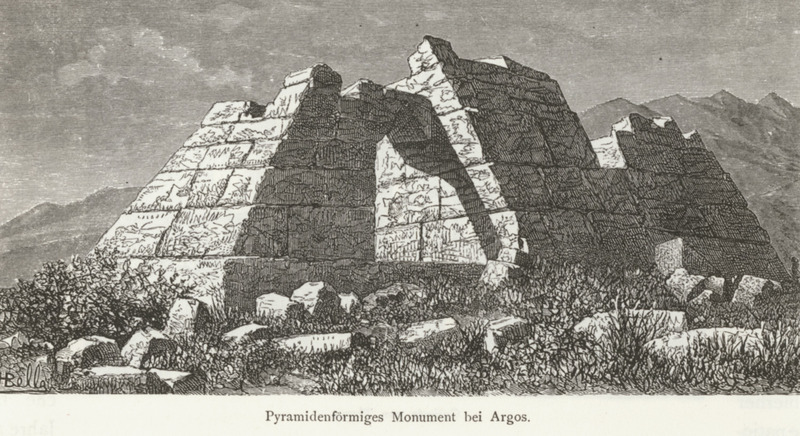
1887 illustration of the pyramid.

Although these structures are of great interest, written references are rather scarce and they are not mentioned in ancient sources. Pausanias (2nd century AD) mentions two buildings resembling pyramids, one, 19 kilometres (12 mi) southwest of the still standing structure at Hellinikon, a common tomb for soldiers who died in a legendary struggle for the throne of Argos, and another which he was told was the tomb of Argives killed in a battle around 669/8 BC. Neither of these still survives.

On the way from Argos to Epidauria there is on the right a building made very like a pyramid, and on it in relief are wrought shields of the Argive shape. Here took place a fight for the throne between Proetus and Acrisius. The contest, they say, ended in a draw, and a reconciliation resulted afterwards, as neither could gain a decisive victory. The story is that they and their hosts were armed with shields, which were first used in this battle. For those that fell on either side was built here a common tomb, as they were fellow citizens and kinsmen.

== Excavations and dating ==
The pyramid in Hellenikon was excavated first circa 1900 by Theodor Wiegand, who essentially removed all the fill from the floor. Later, in 1937, more excavation was made by the American School of Archaeology at Athens by the direction of L. Lord who concluded that both the structure at Ligurio and the one at Cephalaria were "guard houses capable of accommodating a small garrison who could control the countryside and be safe behind their walls from surprise attacks by a few persons". Amongst the findings are a large pithos, the floor of the long corridor and the room, re-carved from repairs, entrance door, and parts of the wall, infill from earlier excavations. Some ceramics of Early Helladic II period (2800–2500 BC) were identified by Saul Weinberg, a member of the team. Their location and distribution however are not described clearly. There are also room foundations and mortars from later uses of the building, as well as dirt with ceramics of classical period (lamps, house ware), and some few coarse sherds of doubtful age, and some Roman lamps, all of which are mixture-disturbed so stratigraphy is not possible. The infill at the floor varies between 20 and 60 cm.

There is considerable controversy about the dates of these structures, with conflict between dating based on archeological excavations and dating through what was at the time the new technique of thermoluminescence dating. Ioannis Liritzis and his team argue for an early date through five sub-projects: 1) geophysical prospection inside and around the two pyramidals at Hellenikon and Ligourio, were buried monuments when discovered, 2) the excavations were performed by the archaeologist A. Sampson and The Archaeological Museum of Nauplion. Amongst the new finds were foundations of rooms, ceramics of Classical, Hellenistic, Roman and Protochristian periods, and Early Helladic II in the exterior foundations of Hellenikon above the bedrock. A comparative study of masonries was also made, 3) there is an astronomical orientation of the Long Entrance Corridor related to the rise of Orion's belt occurring in c. 2400–2000 BC, 4) the dating of some parts of the overlying large megalithic blocks in the wall, with the novel thermoluminescence dating method of rock surfaces. Sampling was chosen for their firmness and lack of sun exposure of internal contact surfaces, by removing a few milligrams of powder from pieces in firm contact. Seven pieces gave an age range of c. 2500–2000 BC, while two ceramic sherds of non-diagnostic typology one from Hellenikon and one from Ligourio dated by TL and OSL gave concordant ages of 3000±250 BC and 660±200 BC respectively. This time frame would date construction of these structures to a time overlapping the construction of the pyramids in Egypt.

Mary Lefkowitz has criticised this research. She suggests that some of the research was done not to determine the reliability of the dating method, as was suggested, but to substantiate an assumption of age and to make certain statements about pyramids and Greek civilization. She notes that not only are the results not very precise, but that other structures mentioned in the research are not in fact pyramids, e.g. a tomb alleged to be the tomb of Amphion and Zethus near Thebes, a structure at Stylidha (Thessaly) which is just a long wall, etc. She also notes the possibility that the stones that were dated might have been recycled from earlier constructions. She also notes that earlier research from the 1930s, confirmed during the 1980s by Fracchia, was ignored. She argues that they performed their research using a novel, previously untested method in order to confirm a predetermined theory about the age of these structures.

Liritzis responded in a journal article published in 2011, stating that Lefkowitz failed to understand and misinterpreted the methodology.

A. Sampson wrote that it was "already proved that the monument stood on Early Helladic constructions, therefore it was built in a later time. Besides, the masonry of the pyramid, similar to that of Ligourio, leads us to the Classic or Late Classic years. A new method for dating the stone, recently applied to the pyramids, indicated a too early dating in the 4th and 3rd millennium BC, which of course cannot be accepted."

== Dimensions ==
The dimensions of the rectangular building surrounding the pyramid of Hellinikon are 7.03 meters by 9.07 metres. The external walls rise at a 60 degree angle up to 3.5 metres. The walls then become vertical in order to support the floor of the building. The entire monument is built from grey limestone from the district in the form of large blocks used in a trapezoidal/partially polygonal system.

== See also ==
- Pyramid of Hellinikon
- Ancient Greek architecture
- Classical Greek architecture
- Greek temple
- Pausanias (geographer)
- Pyramids of Egypt
- List of ancient pyramids

== Sources ==
- Theodore Wiegand, Monograph of 1901.
- Louis E. Lord, The "Pyramids" of Argolis, Hesperia, Vol. 7, No. 4 (1938), pp. 481–527, doi:10.2307/146570, JSTOR 146570.
- Louis E. Lord, M. Alison Frantz, Carl Roebuck, Blockhouses in the Argolid, Hesperia, Vol. 10, No. 2 (Apr. - Jun., 1941), pp. 93–112 doi:10.2307/146534 JSTOR 146534.
- "Greece." European Pyramids. N.p., n.d. Web. 15 Apr 2012. <http://www.european-pyramids.eu/wb/pages/european-pyramids/greece.php>.
