= Panaritis =

Panaritis is a Greek surname. Notable people with the surname include:

- Elena Panaritis (fl. 1989), Greek economist and politician
- Vasileios Panaritis (1924–2004), Greek politician and lawyer

== See also ==
- Panariti, Corinthia, Greek village
- Edmond Panariti (born 1960), Albanian academic and politician
