= Myloi, Argolis =

Myloi Μύλοι
- Community
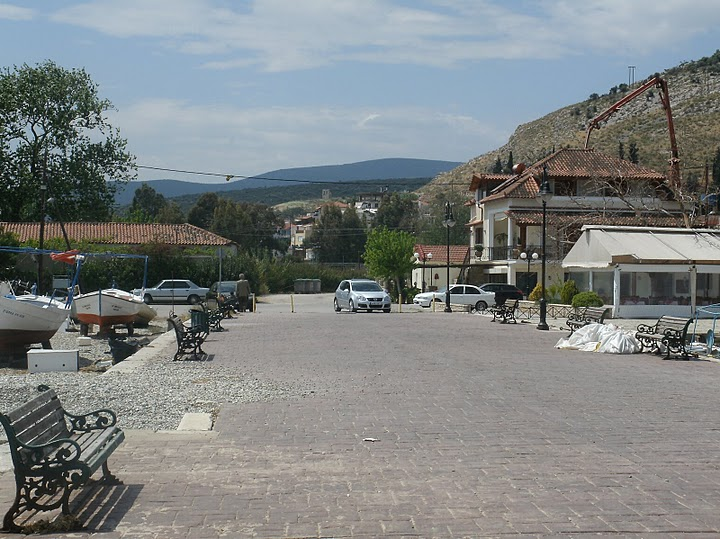
- A view of Myloi from the quay

- Location within Greece
- Coordinates: 37°33′N 22°43′E
- Country: Greece
- Administrative region: Peloponnese
- Regional unit: Argolis
- Municipality: Argos-Mykines
- Municipal unit: Lerna
- Elevation: 29 m (95 ft)

Population (2021)
  - Community: 940
- Time zone: UTC+2 (EET)
  - Summer (DST): UTC+3 (EEST)
- Postal code: 212 00
- Area code: 27510
- Vehicle registration: AP

Myloi (Greek: Μύλοι), is a village in the southwestern part of Argolis, Greece. Myloi was the seat of the former municipality of Lerna. It is 4 km southwest of Nea Kios, 9 km south of Argos and 8 km west of Nafplio. The Greek National Road 7 passes through the village. It had a train station on the Corinth–Kalamata railway, but passenger service on this line was halted in 2010.

Situated on the northwestern coast of the Argolic Gulf, Myloi is a popular fishing village and local tourist destination for its beaches and restaurants, hotels, market, and bakery open for most of the year.

== Sites ==
=== Lerna ===
Lerna is a Bronze Age settlement site located in Myloi that was occupied from the Neolithic to the Mycenean period (6th - 1st century BC). Excavated by the American School of Classical Studies in Athens, several buildings were recovered with the most famous being the House of the Tiles, a large monumental building names after the remains of baked roofing tiles.

The site is managed by the Ephorate of Antiquities of Argolida and can be visited with the price of admission.

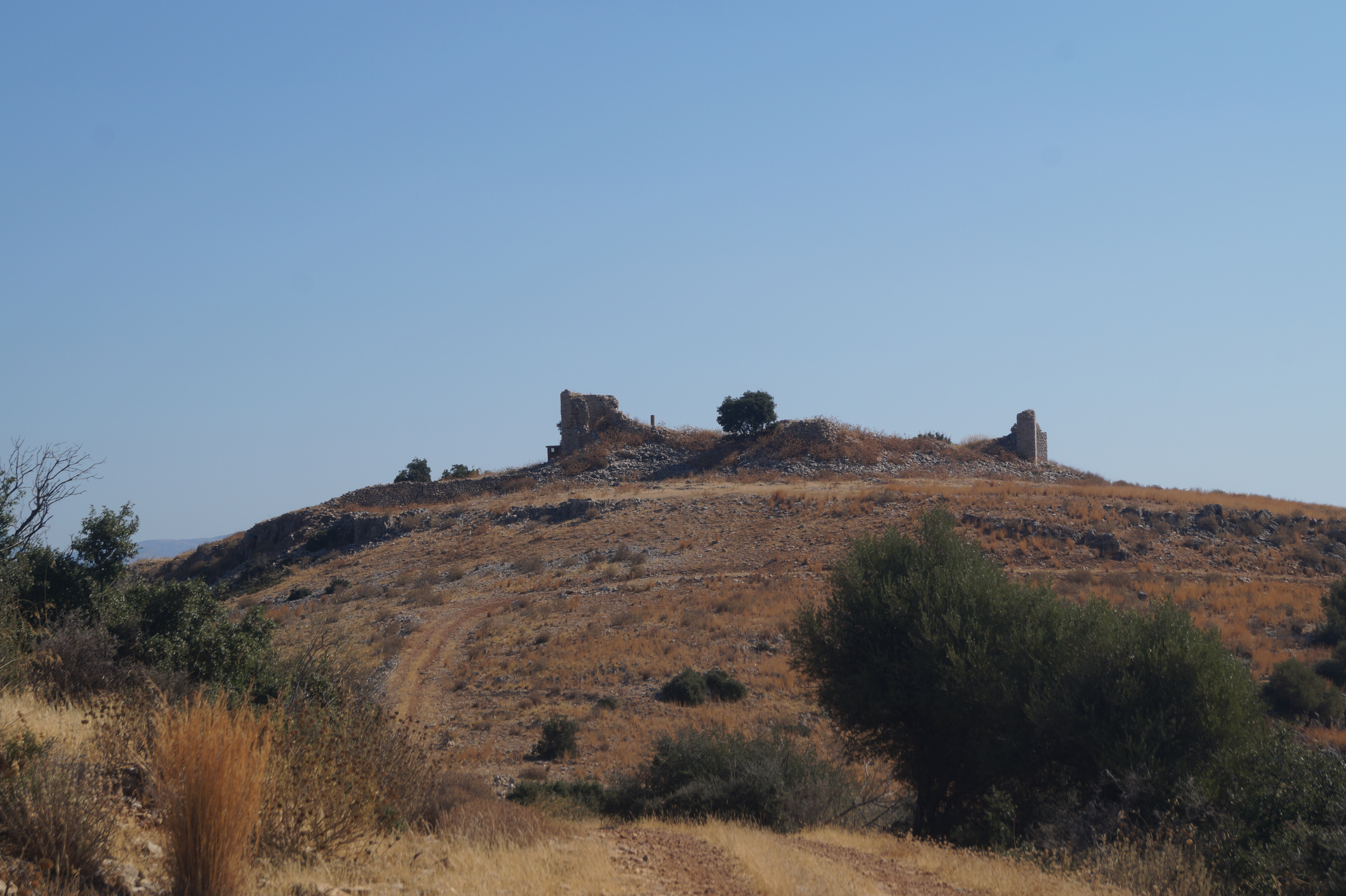
View of the Castle of Kiveri by User:Schuppi / Wikimedia Commons / CC-BY-SA-4.0

=== Castle Kiveri ===
Built during the 14th century AD, the remains of the Castle of Kiveri. are located on Pontinos Hill, overlooking the Argolic Gulf. While there are mentions of a Temple of Athena Saitis by Pausanias in this location, the structures that remain date to the Frankish period and are attributed to Gautier de Brienne. The castle and surrounding structures are said to have been destroyed during the first Ottoman–Venetian War (1463–1479).

Today, a few standing structures remaining and a modern church can be found on the top of the hill.

== Population ==
Year	Population
1981	698
1991	552
2001	921
2011	741
2021	940

== See also ==
- List of settlements in Argolis
