= Monastiraki, Argolis =

Monastiraki Μοναστηράκι
- Community
- Location within Greece
- Coordinates: 37°42′20″N 22°45′0″E
- Country: Greece
- Administrative region: Peloponnese
- Regional unit: Argolis
- Municipality: Argos-Mykines
- Municipal unit: Mykines

Population (2021)
  - Community: 244
- Time zone: UTC+2 (EET)
  - Summer (DST): UTC+3 (EEST)

Monastiraki (Greek: Μοναστηράκι, literally: "little monastery") is a village in Argolis prefecture, built on the foot of mount Evia, between two low hills. It is located adjacent to ancient Mycenae and the Heraion of Argos, with a view of the entire Argolic plain. Monastiraki was a separate local community until 1997, when it was merged into the (then) municipality of Mykines.

== History ==
In ancient times, Monastiraki was of particular importance to its neighbouring cities, as shown by an ancient quarry, from where Mycenaeans would dig out rock for their funerary monuments.

The modern village was founded during the Turkish rule of Greece when a clean water spring was discovered in what is now the central square of the village. Because of this, the residents of nearby Plessa village (which no longer exists) moved to the newly found land, creating Priftiani ("Priest's Village"). The name is of Arvanitic origin, the language of the people who were among those who comprised its first residents.

On 11 September 1928, in an effort of the Greek government to Hellenize Arvanitic, Slavic, Venetian etc. village names all over Greece, Priftiani was renamed as Monastiraki, a name inspired by a local cave which was home to a monk.

In the same year, a school also opened for the first time and was accommodated in a two-storey building. Consequently, it was accommodated in a new building in central Monastiraki, serving students from the village itself and from other, nearby places as the sole one-seat primary school of the area up until the early 2000s, when it was shut down due to small student numbers.

The patron saint of the village is Saint Nicholas. Modern-day Monastiraki is regarded as an agricultural village, with its residents working, almost exclusively, in the rutaceae and olive cultivation field. The "Star Club" (Greek: Σύλλογος Αστερίων) frequently organizes various cultural events in the village. Monastiraki is served by a bus line.
