= Achladokampos =

Achladokampos Αχλαδόκαμπος
- Municipal unit
- Location within the regional unit

- Location within Greece
- Coordinates: 37°31′N 22°35′E
- Country: Greece
- Administrative region: Peloponnese
- Regional unit: Argolis
- Municipality: Argos-Mykines

Area
  - Municipal unit: 105.9 km^{2} (40.9 sq mi)

Population (2021)
  - Municipal unit: 407
  - Municipal unit density: 3.84/km^{2} (9.95/sq mi)
- Time zone: UTC+2 (EET)
  - Summer (DST): UTC+3 (EEST)
- Postal code: 210 57
- Vehicle registration: AP

Achladokampos (Greek: Αχλαδόκαμπος) is a village and a former community in Argolis, Peloponnese, Greece. Since the 2011 local government reform it is part of the municipality Argos-Mykines, of which it is a municipal unit. The municipal unit has an area of 105.883 km^{2}. Population 407 (2021). It is located on a mountainside approximately midway between Argos and Tripoli (~30 km from each) at an elevation of approximately 450 meters.

A significant number of emigrants from Achladokampos have settled in the United States since the early 20th century and have formed the Brotherhood of Achladokambiton as a means of keeping in touch.
