= Berbati Valley =

Coordinates: 37.711783°N 22.802691°E

Berbati Valley (Mastos Hill) (Greece)

The Berbati Valley is an archaeological site located in the northeast of the Peloponnese, northeast of Argos. Human activity and a settlement have been recorded since the Paleolithic era. The Swedish Institute at Athens started with archaeological excavations on the site in 1935, under supervision of Axel W. Persson. The settlement has been in use since Helladic times and a notable find was a Late Mycenaean Potter's Quarters containing over 175.000 ceramic sherds. At first work was focused on excavations in the western part of the Berbati valley itself, but later the investigations came to include the Limnes and Miyio valleys, located to the east.

== History of the excavation ==
In 1934, Axel W. Persson, Gösta Säflund and Erik J. Holmberg went to Berbati to locate possible sites for excavations. The most promising prospect was the eastern slopes of the Mastos Hill, where a Mycenean chamber tomb was found. In 1936, Persson and Åke Åkerström explored the eastern slopes of the Mastos Hill and found what would later be called the Potter's Quarters. Säflund investigated the Western Necropolis northwest of the Mastos Hill. In 1937 he also excavated part of an Early Helladic settlement that continued into the Middle Helladic period. Archeological work was carried out in the Potter's Quarters until the Second World War put a stop to all Greek fieldwork. Åkerström continued archeological excavations of Mastos Hill in 1953 until 1959.

Berit Wells started a large-scale fieldwork at the site in the late 1980s. Between 1988 and 1990, a surface survey of the area surrounding the site was carried out, however not including the Mastos Hill due to the earlier excavations in the 1930s and 1950s. In 1994, The Berbati Valley Project was initiated with a main objective of analysing the agricultural economy in the area.

== History of the area ==
The earliest remains in the Berbati and Limnes valleys date from the Middle Palaeolithic (around 100.000–35.000 BCE) period, with a limited number of flaked stone tools suggesting frequent human visits over a long period of time. During the Upper Palaeolithic (around 30.000–11.000 BCE) a decline in material is noticeable. The lack of a human presence at this time may be explained by the occurrence of the glacial maximum around 18.000 BC, probably making the ancient coastal plain more attractive. During the Mesolithic, two sites from around 11.000–10.000 BC are attested both located under vertical lime stone cliffs in the Klisoura pass, a position from which the sites were well placed to benefit from the animals and plants along the nearby stream.

Following the abandonment of the Mesolithic sites no human activity can be seen before the Early Neolithic / early Middle Neolithic period (around 6000–4500 BCE). At this time a large settlement existed in the valley. During Late and Final Neolithic period (around 4500–3000 BCE) there was an expansion of sites in the Berbati Valley. These sites were agricultural in nature with evidence suggesting sheep and goat herding. There is also evidence of hierarchy between different sites with one site being more centrally located than the others.

From the Early Helladic period (around 3100–2000 BCE) there are 21 sites known. In the Berbati valley habitation was concentrated to the southern slope of Psili Rachi, with several advantages, the location offered plenty of sunlight compared to the slopes of Euboia, it was also easy to see anyone entering the valley from the Klisoura pass, and the fertile valley floor could be used for agriculture.

Mastos hill was also inhabited during the Late Helladic period (around 1600–1070 BCE) with activity taking place at the Potter's Quarter on the eastern slope. The most spectacular structure here was the kiln and two pottery dumps, dated to LH II / LH IIIA1 (around 1400 BCE). Vessels produced at Mastos have been found on Cyprus and in the Levant. Following LH IIIC (possibly before 1070 BCE) it appears that the areas investigated were all but abandoned, with extremely few finds.

Around 750 BCE there are signs of human activity again in the Berbati valley, but in a smaller scale, that will later expand with population growth during the Late Archaic period (around 525-480 BCE). The area reaches a peak in population during the late 4th century BCE and the archeological finds suggests that agriculture had an essential role during this time. During the 2nd century BCE there is a decline in settlements in the area. This also continues during the Roman Imperial period and archaeological finds suggests that the population moved to cities, while slaves used the land for agriculture.

== See also ==
- Swedish Institute at Athens

== Sources ==
- Swedish Institute at Athens - Berbati valley, Argolid: https://www.sia.gr/en/articles.php?tid=367&page=1
