= Adami-nekeb =

Adami-nekeb according to the Revised Version, or Adami-hannekeb (Hebrew: אדמי הנקב, i.e. the pass Adami), is a place mentioned in the Hebrew Bible's Book of Joshua, as a passage on the frontier of Naphtali. It is mentioned only in Joshua 19:33.

The Vulgate gives Adami quae est Neceb, "Adami, which is Neceb," while the King James Version translates as two separate names, "Adami" and "Nekeb", as does the Septuagint: ΑΡΜΕ ΚΑΙ ΝΕΒΩΚ(Codex Vaticanus), or ΑΡΜΑΙ ΚΑΙ ΝΕΚΕΒ (Codex Alexandrinus). The Jerusalem Talmud (Megillah 11) also divides the expression, Adami being represented as Damin, and Hannekeb as Caidatah.

Adolf Neubauer and George Adam Smith identify Adami with Damieh, 5 miles west of Tiberias, the site proposed by the Palestine Exploration Survey for the 'fenced city' Adamah of Joshua 19:36. This, notes T. K. Cheyne, seems too far south considering that the 'tree of Bezaanim' (see Zaanaim) was close to Kedesh, while Jabneel appears to have been a north Galilean fortress. These are the two localities between which Adami-nekeb is mentioned in Joshua 19:33. It is probable that the name Nkbu in the Karnak list of Thutmose III means the pass Adami.
