= Dimaina =

Dimaina Δήμαινα
- Community
- Location within Greece
- Coordinates: 37°41′31″N 23°04′19″E
- Country: Greece
- Administrative region: Peloponnese
- Regional unit: Argolis
- Municipality: Epidavros
- Municipal unit: Epidavros

Population (2021)
  - Community: 458
- Time zone: UTC+2 (EET)
  - Summer (DST): UTC+3 (EEST)

Dimaina (Greek: Δήμαινα) is a village and a community in Argolis, Greece. With Nea Epidavros, Palaia Epidavros and Tracheia it is part of the Epidaurus municipality. The community includes the village Nea Dimaina.

Near Dimaina there is famous monastery of Taxiarchon built in 15th century. The founder of the monastery was the Patriarch Niphon of Constantinople.

== Historical population ==
Year	Settlement	Community
1991	532	
2001	544	649
2011	435	520
2021	368	458
