= Adami, Argolis =

Village in Argolis

Coordinates: 37°34′22″N 23°04′25″E

Adami Αδάμι
- Village
- Interactive map of Adami
- Country: Greece
- Region: Peloponnese
- Regional unit: Argolis
- Municipality: Epidaurus
- Elevation: 480 m (1,570 ft)

Population (2021)
  - Total: 253
- Time zone: UTC+2 (EET)
  - Summer (DST): UTC+3 (EEST)
- Postal code: 21052
- Area code: +30 27530

Adami (Αδάμι) is a semi‑mountainous village in the municipality of Epidaurus, Argolis, in the Peloponnese, Greece. Located on the northern slopes of Mount Mavrovouni at approximately 480 m elevation, it lies about 8 km from Lygourio and near the ancient sanctuary of Asclepius.

== History ==
Adami was first recorded during the Venetian era (pre‑1700 AD), with around 135 inhabitants noted in 17th‑century census records. It became part of the modern Epidaurus municipality following the 2010 administrative reforms.

== Geography ==
A semi‑mountainous agricultural settlement, Adami offers panoramic views of the Epidaurus valley. It is bordered by farmland and olive groves typical of rural farming life in Argolis.

== Demographics ==
Population over time:

1981	424
1991	352
2001	337
2011	302
2021	253

These numbers reflect a gradual decline common in rural Greek villages.

== Economy ==
The local economy centers on agriculture, primarily olives and livestock, alongside small village services, such as a bakery, taverna, and a community fountain - an emblem of traditional rural life in the region

== Landmarks ==
- Chapel of Profitis Elias on the village hilltop
- A sculpted stone fountain at the village center
- Close to Kalamiou Monastery (~6 km away)
- Near “Charalampos cave,” explored by local speleologists

== Culture and society ==
Adami retains rural traditions through religious festivals at Profitis Elias and community events that highlight its cultural continuity.

== See also ==
- List of settlements in Argolis
- Epidaurus (municipality)
- Argolis
