= Tolo, Greece =

Village in Argolis, Greece

Tolo Τολό
- Community
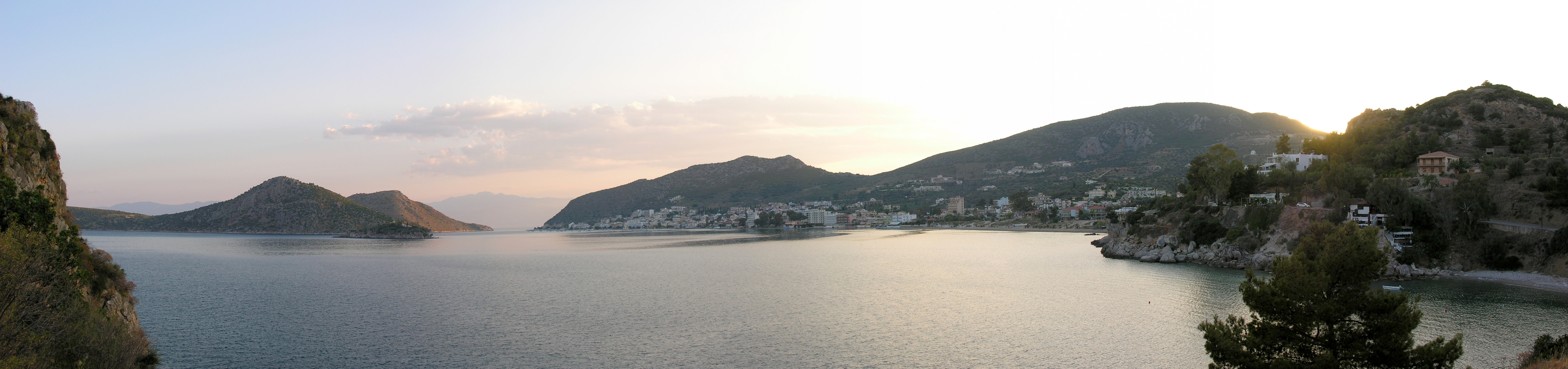
- Panoramic view of Tolo

- Location within Greece
- Coordinates: 37°31′N 22°51′E
- Country: Greece
- Administrative region: Peloponnese
- Regional unit: Argolis
- Municipality: Nafplio
- Municipal unit: Asini
- Elevation: 5 m (16 ft)

Population (2021)
  - Community: 1,358
- Time zone: UTC+2 (EET)
  - Summer (DST): UTC+3 (EEST)
- Postal code: 210 56
- Area code: 2752
- Vehicle registration: ΑΡ
- Website: http://www.tolo.gr/

Tolo (Greek: Τολό), in Katharevousa known as Tolon (Τολόν), is a village in Greece on the Peloponnese peninsula. It is part of the municipal unit Asini, in Argolis.

== History ==
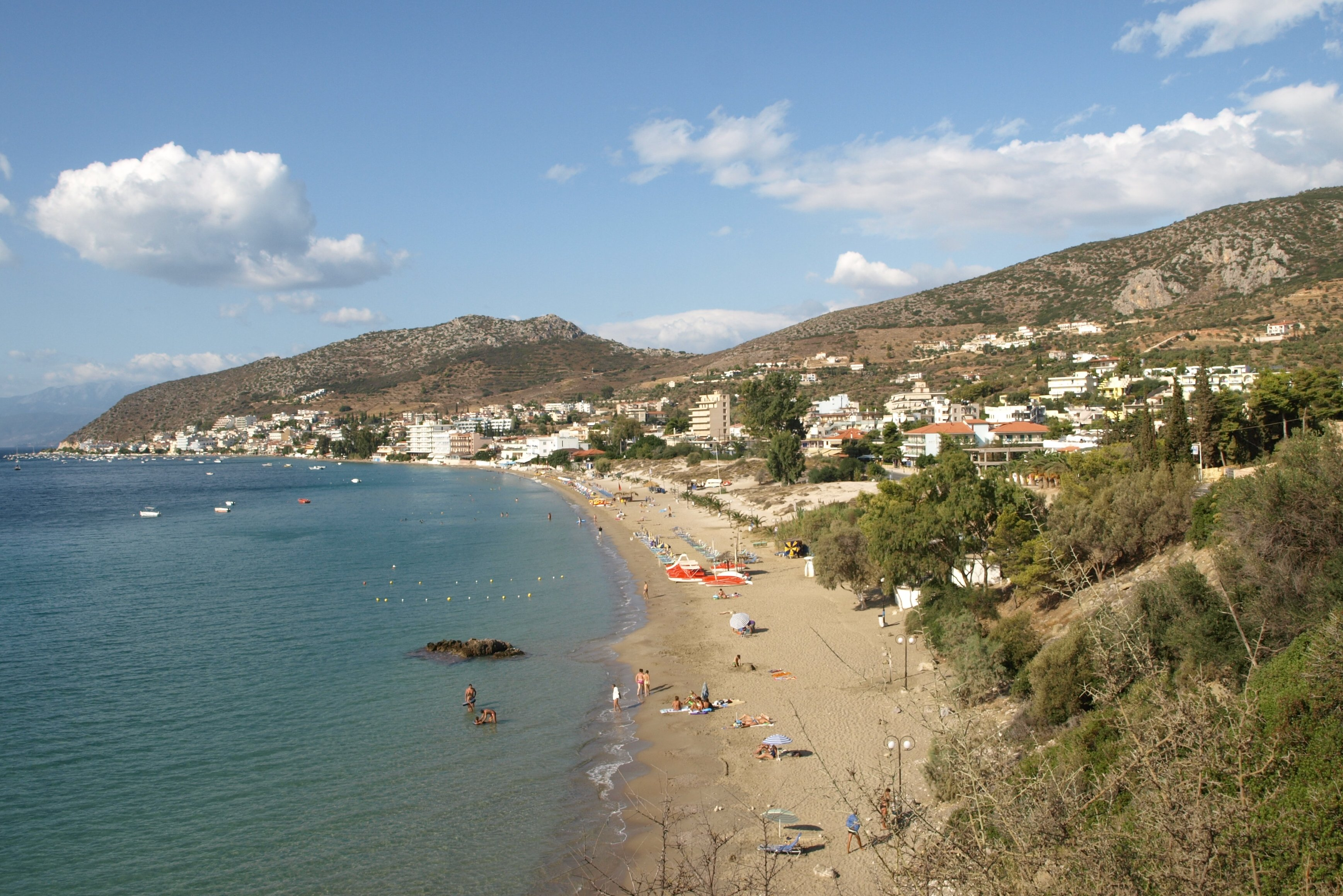
View of Tolo Bay

The bay of Tolon (part of the Argolic Gulf) was first written about by Homer, as was Asini in the Iliad, named as one of the cities whose fleet took part in the Trojan War. In the centuries to come the bay of Tolon gave refuge to battle ships at various times and then during the Byzantine period was revived as an auxiliary port to Nafplio.

Following the Fourth Crusade and the break-up of the Byzantine Empire (1204 AD), along with the rest of the Peloponnese, the area came under Frankish rule until 1389 AD, when it was then taken over by the Venetians, and in 1540 AD to the Ottomans. In the 1680s, during the Morean War, the alliance between the Venetians, the Germans, and the Polish against the Ottoman Empire, the chief of the allied forces, Vice-admiral Francesco Morosini was ordered to capture the capital of the Peloponnese, Nafplio at that time, and the bay of Tolon was chosen as a place suitable as a base of operations for his expedition as it was the safest place in the region, while the shore was used for the army to camp. After the success of his expedition and until 1715 AD, when the area was again occupied by the Turks, Tolon was used as a secondary naval station for the Venetian fleet.

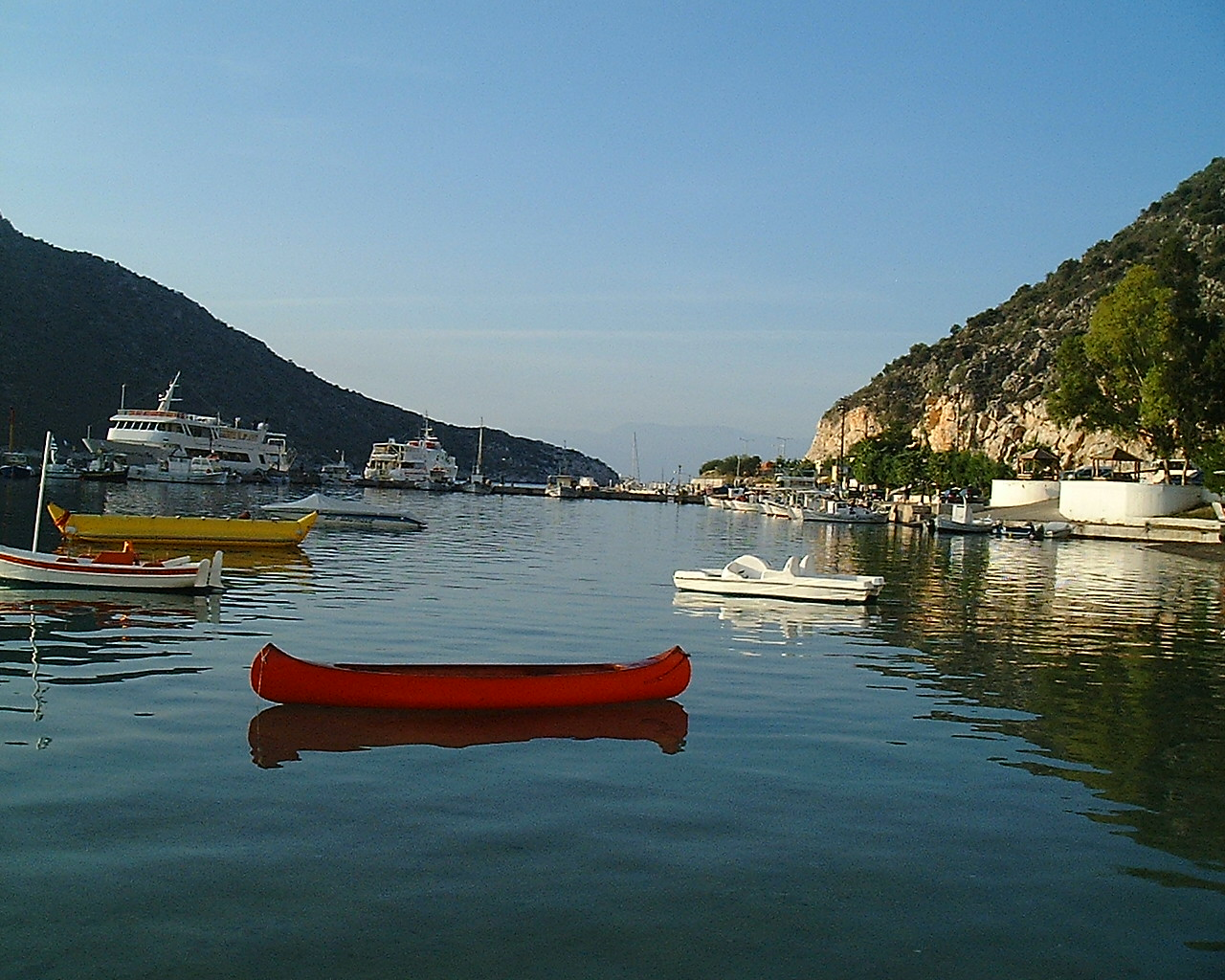
A view of boats in the bay of Tolo, including pier.

A monument of this time is the small church named Zoodochos Pigi, built in 1688, and the ruins of the fortress on the island of Daskaleio in the bay of Tolon. Fortifications, ruins of houses and reservoirs can also be found on Romvi island. Following the Greek Revolution, a number of ethnic-Greek refugees from Crete were resettled in Tolon.

After the establishment of the independent Kingdom of Greece, in 1834, by Royal Decree, a city was founded at the Port of Tolon and named Minoa after Minos the legendary king of Crete. After the liberation of Crete the remaining refugees in the area formed a fishing village which eventually became known as Tolon in 1916.

From the middle of the 20th century, Tolon saw the beginning of the tourist industry and evolved into a summer resort.

== Transportation ==
There is frequent KTEL bus service every day from Nafplion.

== See also ==
- Tolo Bay in Indonesia
