= Manesis, Argolis =

Manesis Μάνεσης
- Settlement
- Location within Greece
- Coordinates: 37°39′37″N 22°49′31″E
- Country: Greece
- Administrative region: Peloponnese
- Regional unit: Argolis
- Municipality: Nafplio
- Municipal unit: Midea
- Elevation: 70 m (230 ft)

Population (2021)
  - Total: 514
- Time zone: UTC+2 (EET)
  - Summer (DST): UTC+3 (EEST)

Manesis (Greek: Μάνεσης, old name: Manesi) is a village in Argolis, Peloponnese, Greece. It had a population of 534 according to the 2011 census.

It owes its name to Turks and Arvanites, who during the period of the Ottoman rule of Greece gave names with Turkish elements to many of the villages in the area (such as Gerbesi or Merbaka).

Its inhabitants, due to the semi-mountainous terrain, are engaged mainly in agriculture. Agricultural production currently includes mainly oranges, tangerines and olives, but historically, from 1930 until recently, tobacco was the most profitable crop. Livestock raised includes mainly goats and sheep, which are used for the traditional local dish giosa, goat or sheep of an age of at least 6 years (so that it has stopped giving birth) cooked in a stone oven.

== Historical population ==
The population of Manesis from 1879 to 2011 according to censuses of ELSTAT:

Historical population
Year	Pop.	±%
1879	155	—
1889	188	+21.3%
1896	253	+34.6%
1907	248	−2.0%
1920	304	+22.6%
1928	307	+1.0%
1940	330	+7.5%
1951	315	−4.5%
1961	679	+115.6%
1971	679	+0.0%
1981	614	−9.6%
1991	611	−0.5%
2001	605	−1.0%
2011	534	−11.7%
2021	514	−3.7%
