= Vasileios Panaritis =

Greek politician

Member of the Hellenic Parliament for Laconia
- In office 1974–1981

Personal details
- Born: 1924 Molaoi
- Died: June 22, 2004 (aged 79–80) Greece
- Resting place: Holy Church of the Birth of Christ, Molaoi
- Party: New Democracy
- Profession: Lawyer, politician

Vasileios Panaritis of Konstantinos (Greek: Βασίλειος Παναρίτης του Κωνσταντίνου; Molaoi, 1924 – 22 June 2004) was a Greek lawyer and politician, who acted as MP for Laconia after the metapolitefsi.

== Biography ==
He was born in Molaoi. He studied law. He was elected MP for Laconia for the first time in the 1974 Greek legislative election with the support of New Democracy with 11,857 preference crosses. He was reelected MP with ND in 1977.

He died on 22 June 2004 and buried the next day in the holy church of the Birth of Christ in Molaoi.
