= Sterna Island =

Sterna Island (65°23′S 65°14′W) is a small island lying 0.7 nautical miles (1.3 km) north of Darboux Island, off the west coast of Graham Land. First charted by the British Graham Land Expedition (BGLE) under Rymill, 1934–37. So named by the United Kingdom Antarctic Place-Names Committee (UK-APC) in 1959 because a large number of terns (Sterna vittata) breed here.

== See also ==
- List of Antarctic and subantarctic islands
