= Asini =

Asini Ασίνη
- Municipal unit
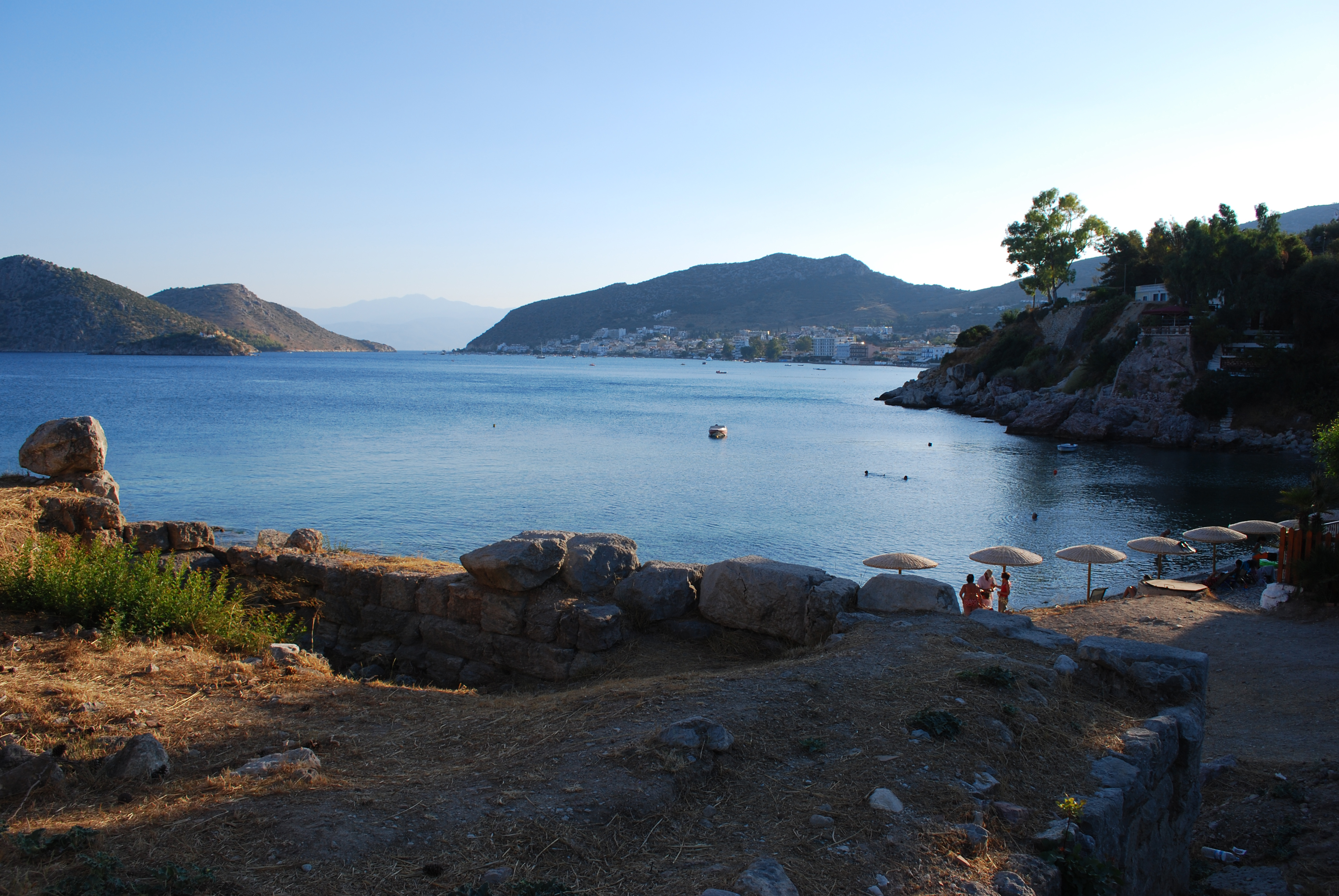

- Location within the regional unit

- Location within Greece
- Coordinates: 37°32′N 22°53′E
- Country: Greece
- Administrative region: Peloponnese
- Regional unit: Argolis
- Municipality: Nafplio

Area
  - Municipal unit: 136.9 km^{2} (52.9 sq mi)

Population (2021)
  - Municipal unit: 5,077
  - Municipal unit density: 37.09/km^{2} (96.05/sq mi)
  - Community: 1,243
- Time zone: UTC+2 (EET)
  - Summer (DST): UTC+3 (EEST)
- Postal code: 210 60
- Area code: 27520
- Vehicle registration: AP

Asini (Greek: Ασίνη) is a village and a former municipality in Argolis, Peloponnese, Greece, named after the ancient city of Asine. Since the 2011 local government reform it is part of the municipality Nafplio, of which it is a municipal unit. The municipal unit has an area of 136.873 km^{2}. Population 5,077 (2021). The seat of the municipality was in Drepano.

== See also ==
- Asine
