= Nea Kios =

Town in Argolis, Greece

Nea Kios Νέα Κίος
- Municipal unit
- Location within the regional unit

- Location within Greece
- Coordinates: 37°35′N 22°44′E
- Country: Greece
- Administrative region: Peloponnese
- Regional unit: Argolis
- Municipality: Argos-Mykines
- Municipal unit: Nea Kios
- Village established: 1926 (100 years ago)

Area
  - Municipal unit: 5.70 km^{2} (2.20 sq mi)
- Elevation: 5 m (16 ft)

Population (2021)
  - Municipal unit: 2,743
  - Municipal unit density: 481/km^{2} (1,250/sq mi)
- Time zone: UTC+2 (EET)
  - Summer (DST): UTC+3 (EEST)
- Postal code: 212 50
- Area code: 2751
- Vehicle registration: AP

Nea Kios (Greek: Νέα Κίος) is a small town and former municipality in Argolis, Peloponnese, Greece. Since the 2011 local government reform it is part of the municipality Argos-Mykines, of which it is a municipal unit. The emblem of the town is Argo. The municipal unit has an area of 5.700 km^{2}. It was founded by refugees from Cius in Bithynia after the expulsion of the Greeks from Asia Minor.

== Geography ==
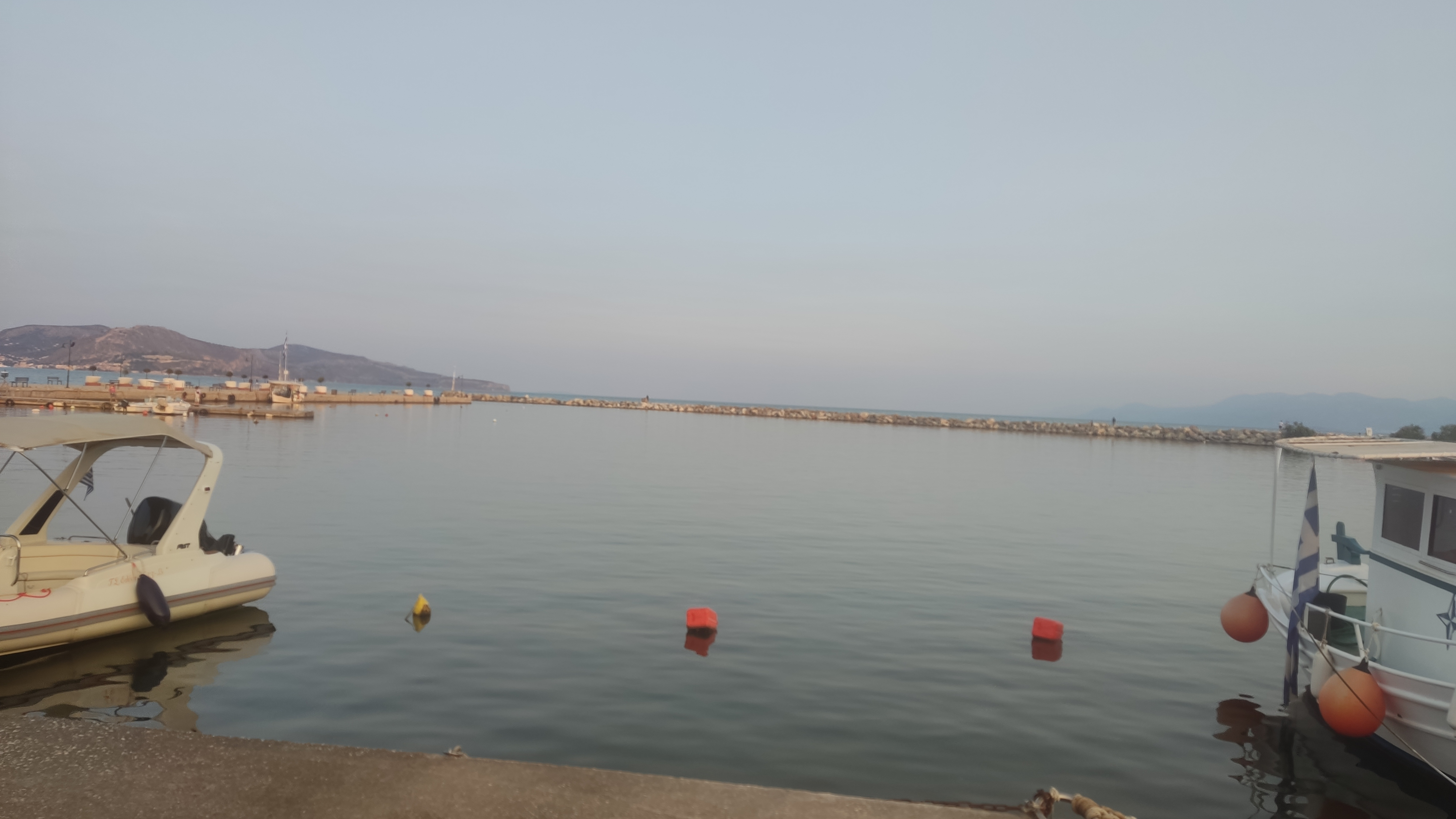
A view of the port of Nea Kios.

Nea Kios is situated in a plain on the coast of the Argolic Gulf, at the mouth of the rivers Inachos and Erasinos. The rivers' waters create marsh in the surrounding area. It is 4 km northwest of Myloi, 6 km south of Argos and 6 km northwest of Nafplio. It is considered the seaport of Argos. Near Nea Kios is the site of the ancient town of Temenium.

== History ==
Nea Kios is the historical continuation of Cius of Asia Minor, a city of 15,000 residents built at the head of the gulf of Cius in Propontis, seat of the Metropolis of Nicaea and seaport of Bursa. Refugees of Cius, after the Asia Minor disaster of 1922, transferred to Kalamaria where they stayed few years before most of them move out for Argolis when they were given space to settle.

The establishment of Nea Kios started in 1926, following the actions of a special commission following the actions of a special committee set up in 1925, chaired by Christos Delis. The settlement began in 1927 and was recognized as a settlement in 1928.

== Historical population ==
Since its establishment, the actual population of Nea Kios according to ELSTAT is:

Year	Municipal unit
1928	1,084
1940	1,899
1951	1,915
1961	2,032
1971	2,180
1981	2,272
1991	2,456
2001	3,646
2011	2,820
2021	2,743

== Culture ==
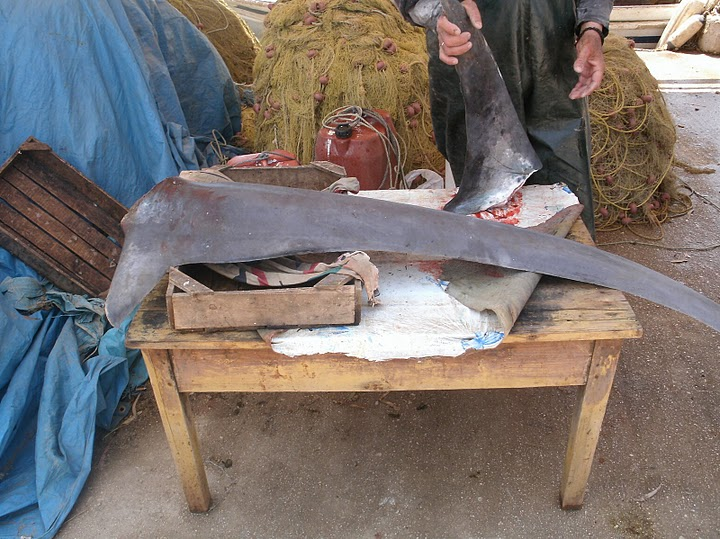
A fisherman in Nea Kios displays his catch.

Since 1982 a museum operates in Nea Kios, named Laskarideio Folklore Museum, which houses costumes and various items from Cius of Asia Minor. The name of the museum is a reference to Evristhenis Laskaridis, a doctor who published books on the history of Cius.

== Sports ==
Two sport clubs are based at Nea Kios, A.C. Argonaftis Nea Kios (="Α.Ο. Αργοναύτης Νέας Κίου"), established in 1933 and Nea Kios Sports Club (="Αθλητικός Όμιλος Νέας Κίου"), established in 1979, which operates under Argonaftis.

== Town partnerships ==
Nea Kios fosters partnerships with the following places:

- Meddersheim, Rhineland-Palatinate, Germany

The partnership agreement between Nea Kios and Meddersheim was read out by mayors Georgios Maninis (Nea Kios) and Tilo Krauß (Meddersheim) and signed amid much festivity on 15 July 2008 in Meddersheim.

== See also ==
- List of settlements in Argolis
