= Argolic Gulf =

Gulf of the Aegean Sea off the east coast of the Peloponnese, Greece

- Αργολικός κόλπος (Greek)
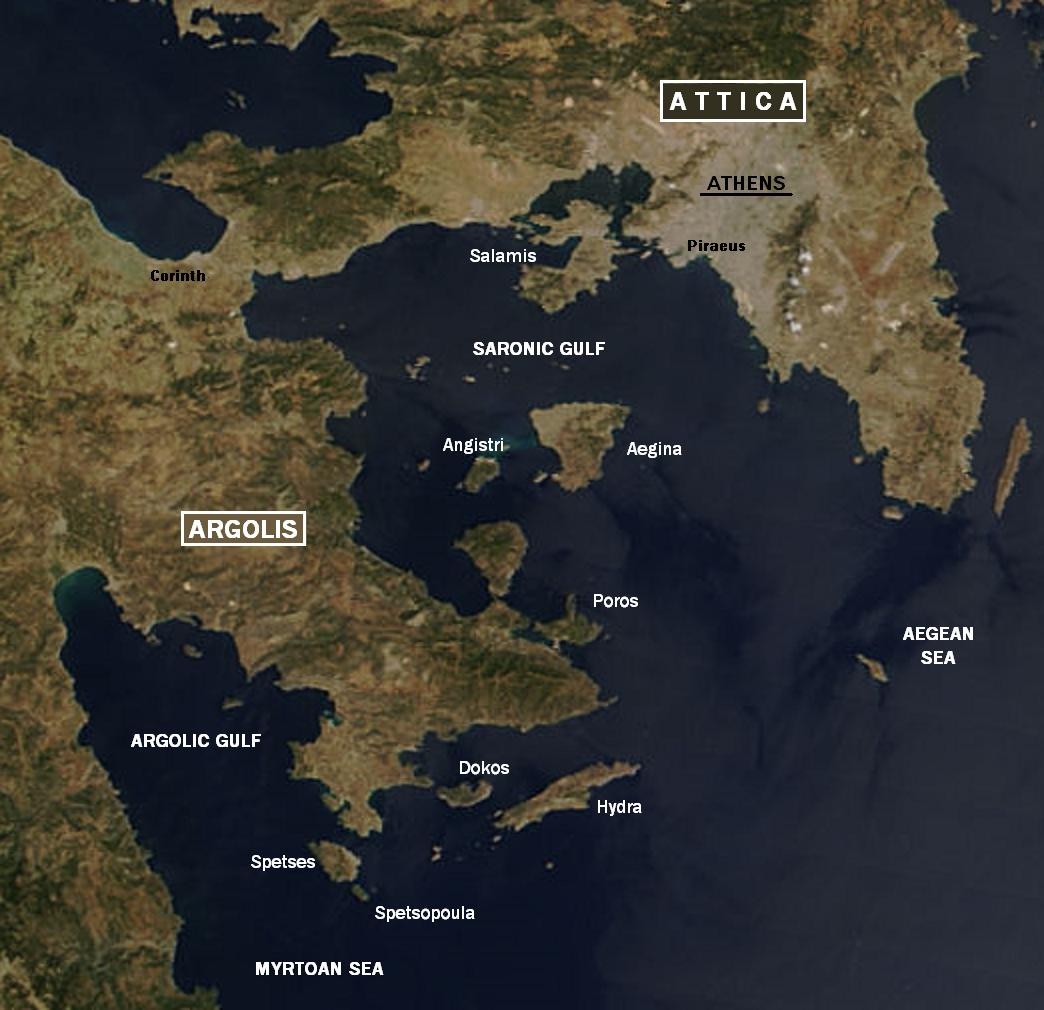
- The Argolic and Saronic Gulfs, separated by the Argolis peninsula

- Location of the Argolic Gulf within Greece
- Location: Peloponnese
- Coordinates: 37°20′N 22°55′E
- Type: Gulf
- Part of: Aegean Sea
- Basin countries: Greece

The Argolic Gulf (Greek: Αργολικός κόλπος, romanized: Argolikós kólpos), also known as the Gulf of Argolis, is a gulf of the Aegean Sea off the east coast of the Peloponnese, Greece. It is about 50 km long and 30 km wide. Its main port is Nafplio, located at its northwestern end. At the entrance to the gulf lies the island of Spetses.

This gulf and its islands are sometimes combined with the Saronic Gulf and the Saronic Islands, forming the Argo-Saronic Gulf and the Argo-Saronic Islands. It is surrounded by two regional units: Arcadia to the southwest and Argolis to the north and east. The river Inachos flows into the Argolic Gulf near Nea Kios.

The main islands in the gulf are Psili, Plateia and Bourtzi, a small island with a Venetian fortress that protects the port of Nafplio. The surrounding mountains protect the gulf from the strong summer Meltemi winds.

The main towns that lie around the gulf are, from southwest to east:

- Tyros
- Paralio Astros
- Myloi
- Nea Kios
- Nafplio
- Tolo (Tolon), on Tolo Bay
- Porto Cheli
- Spetses

== Gallery ==
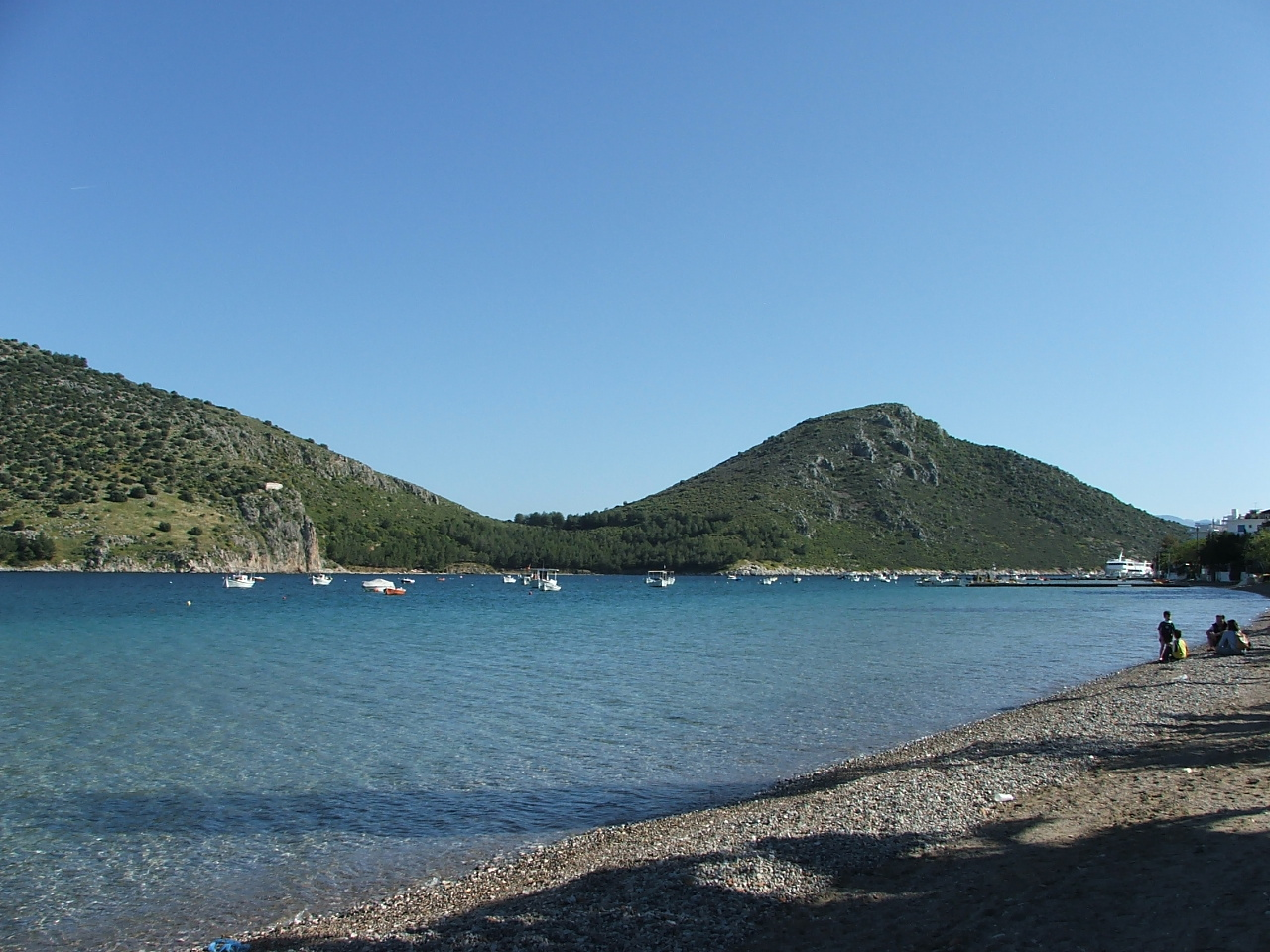
Argolic Gulf - view from Tolo

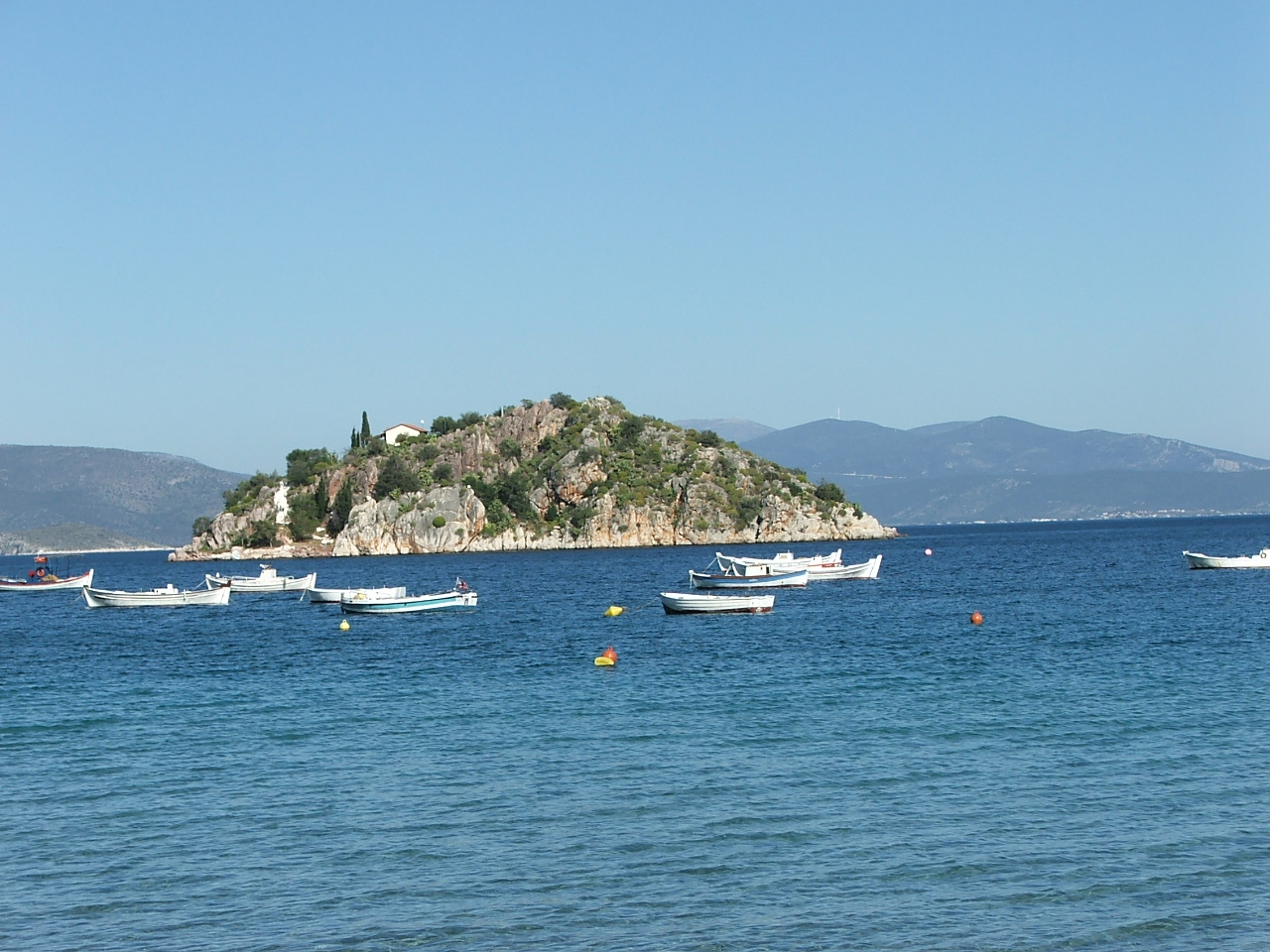
The island and Apostolou Church

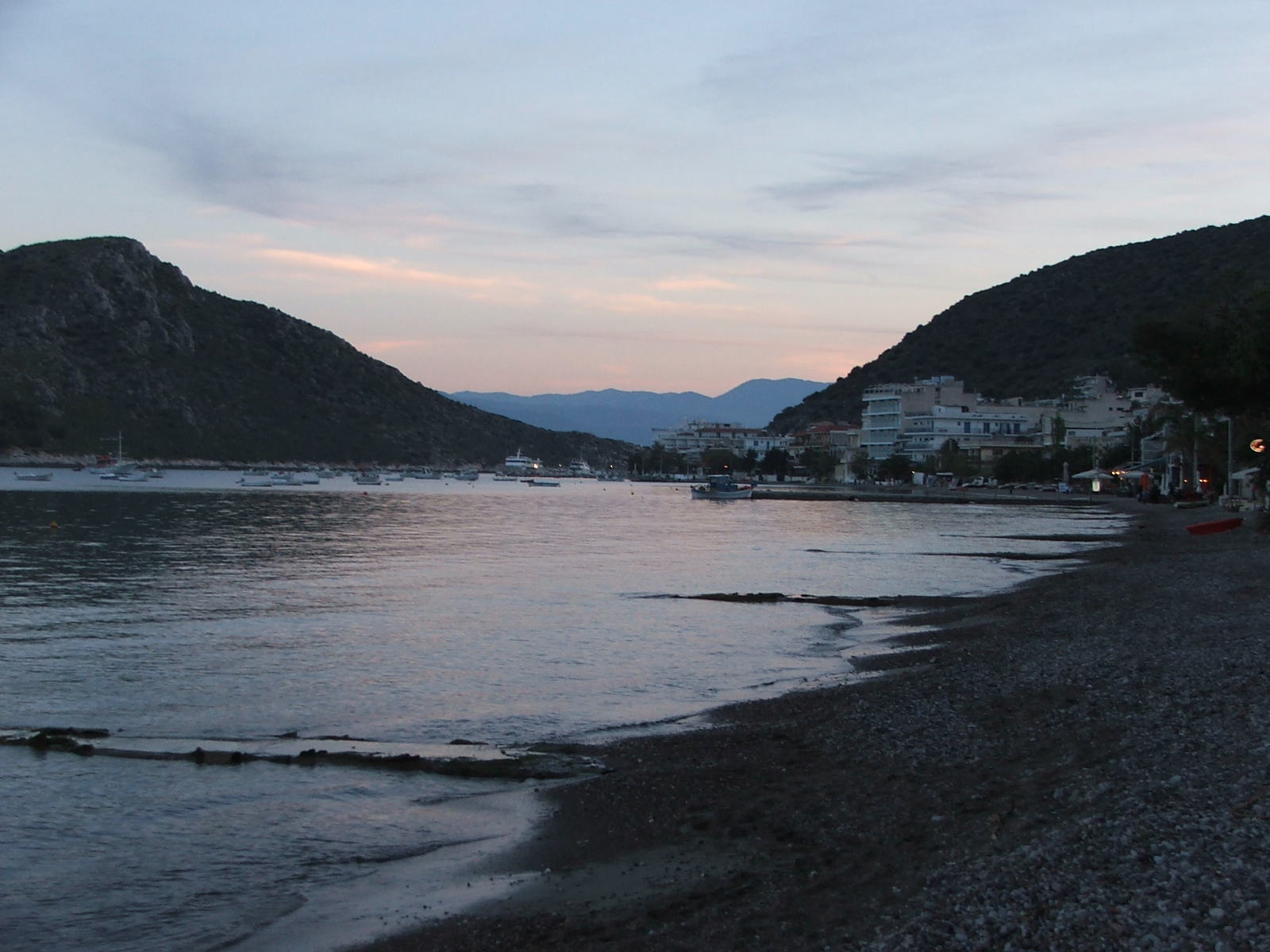
Argolic Gulf

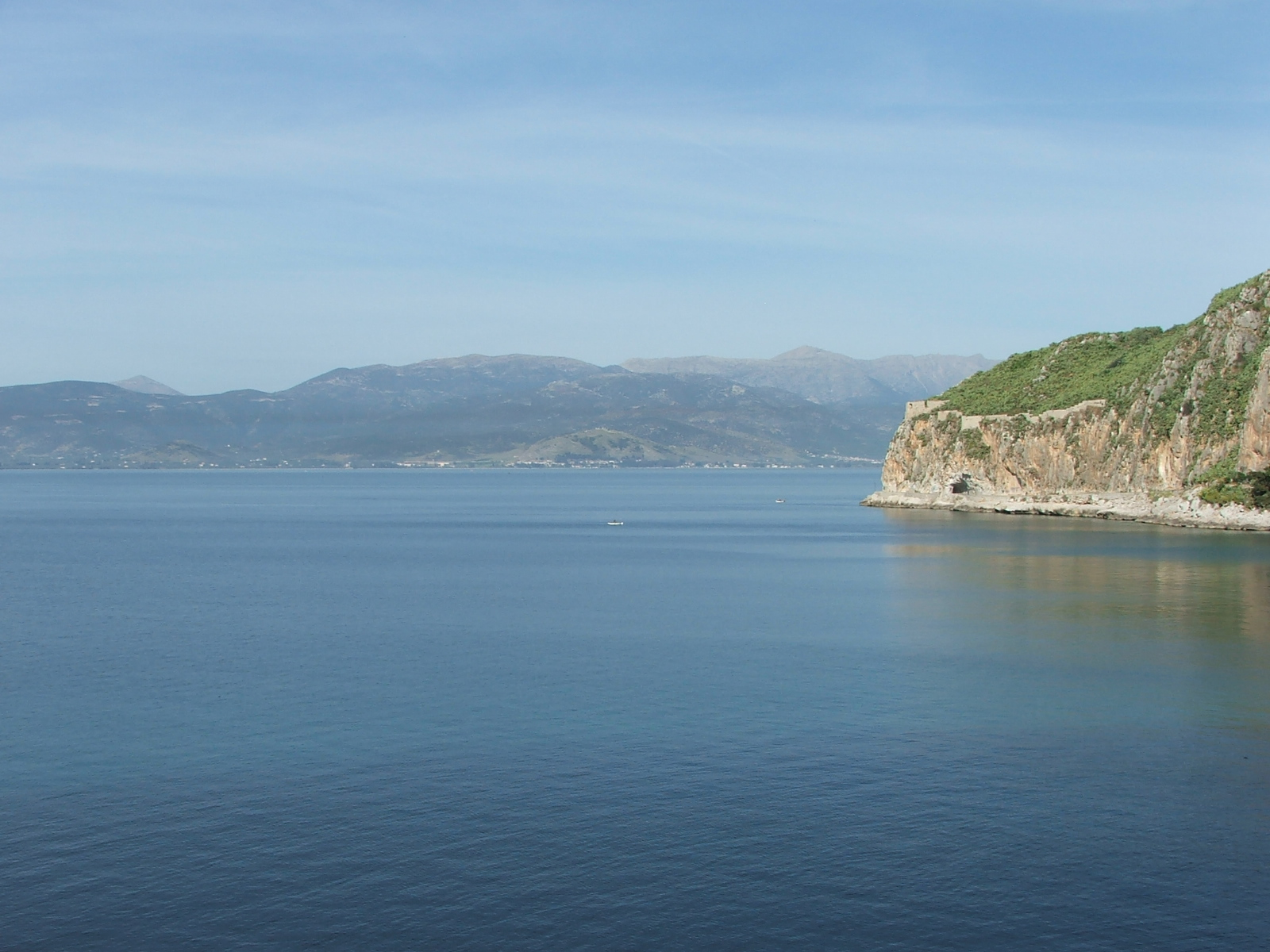
View of the Argolic Gulf from the Palamidi in Nafplio

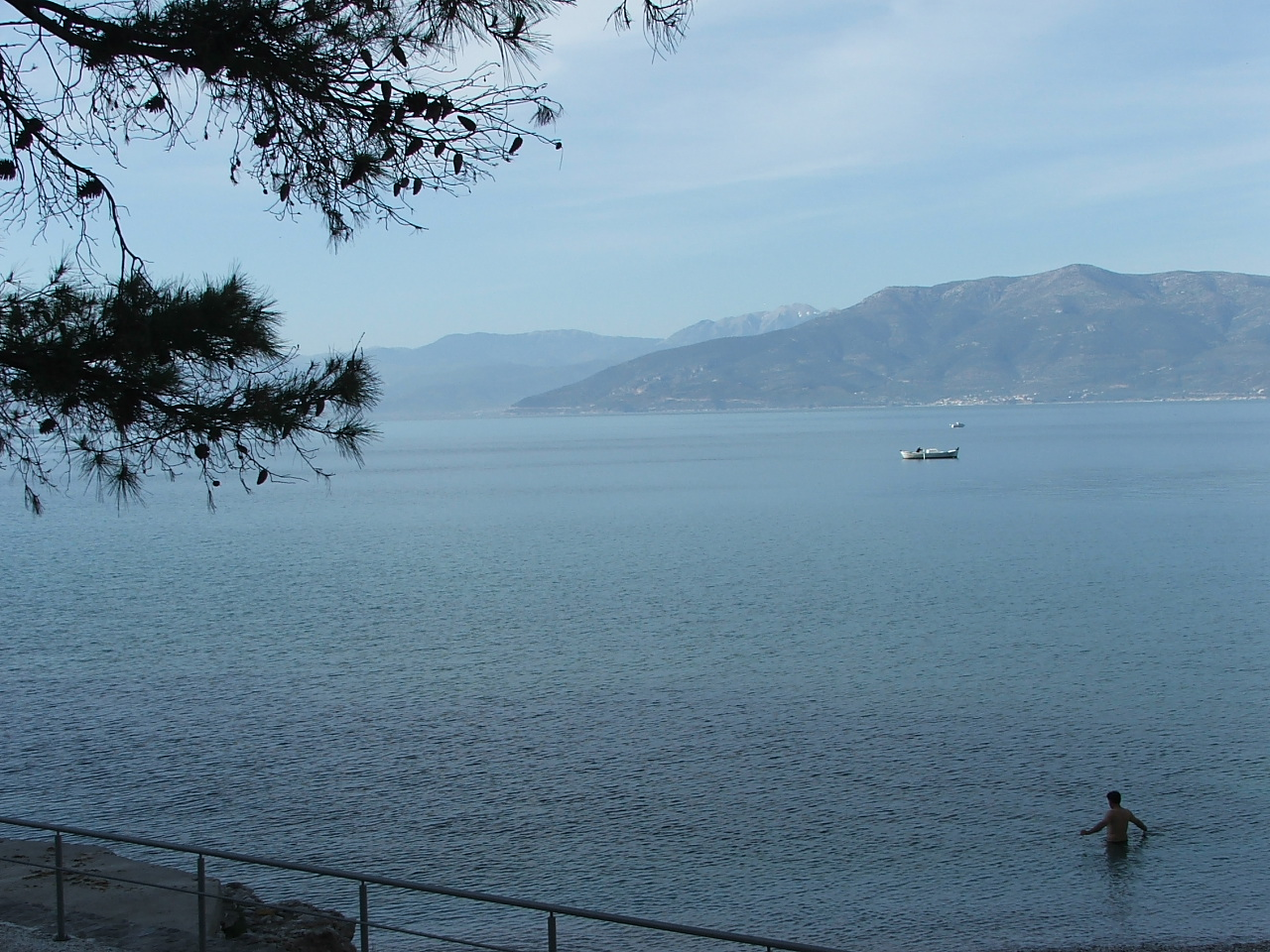
Argolic Gulf - view from Nafplion

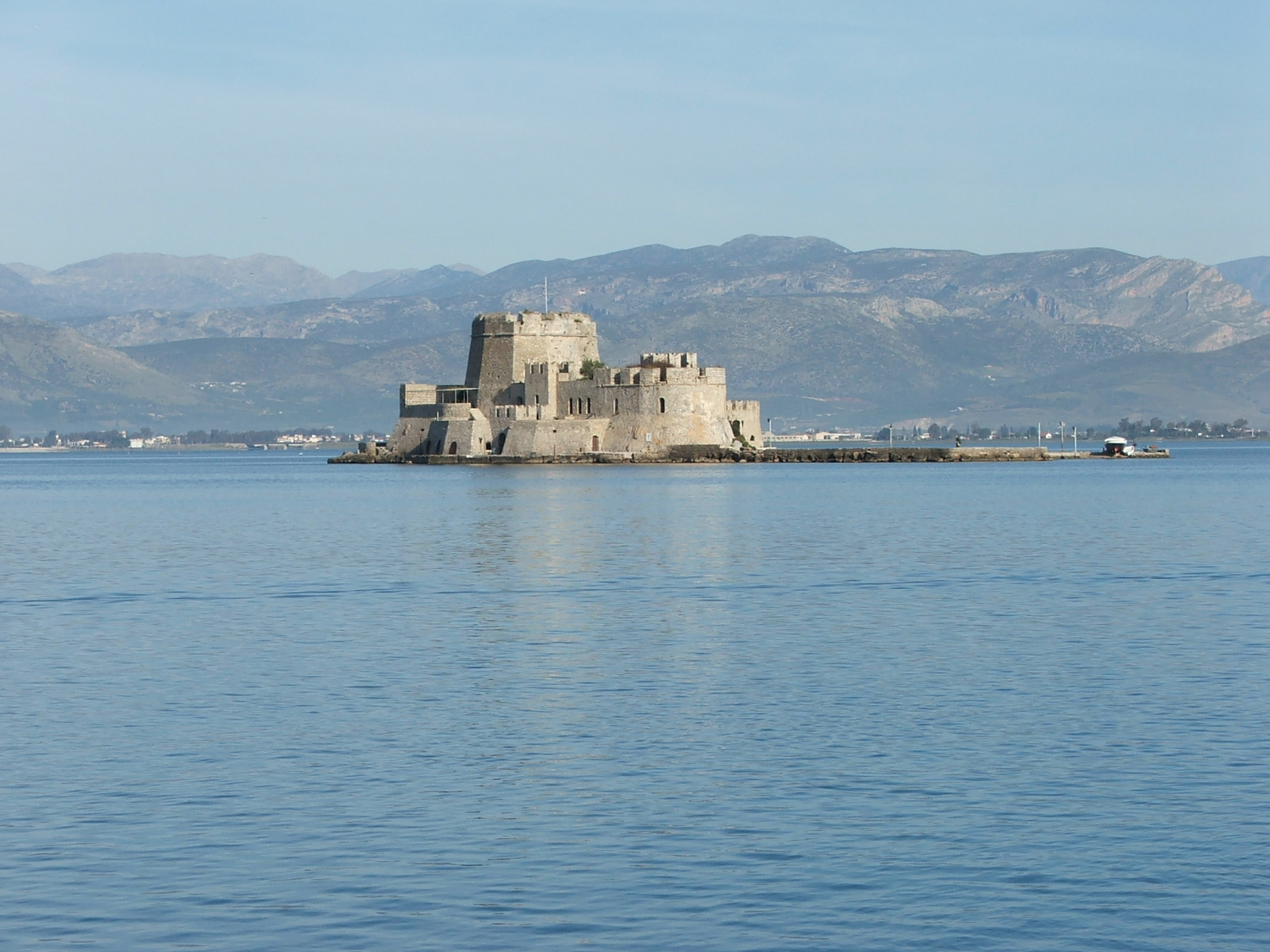
Bourtzi Tower

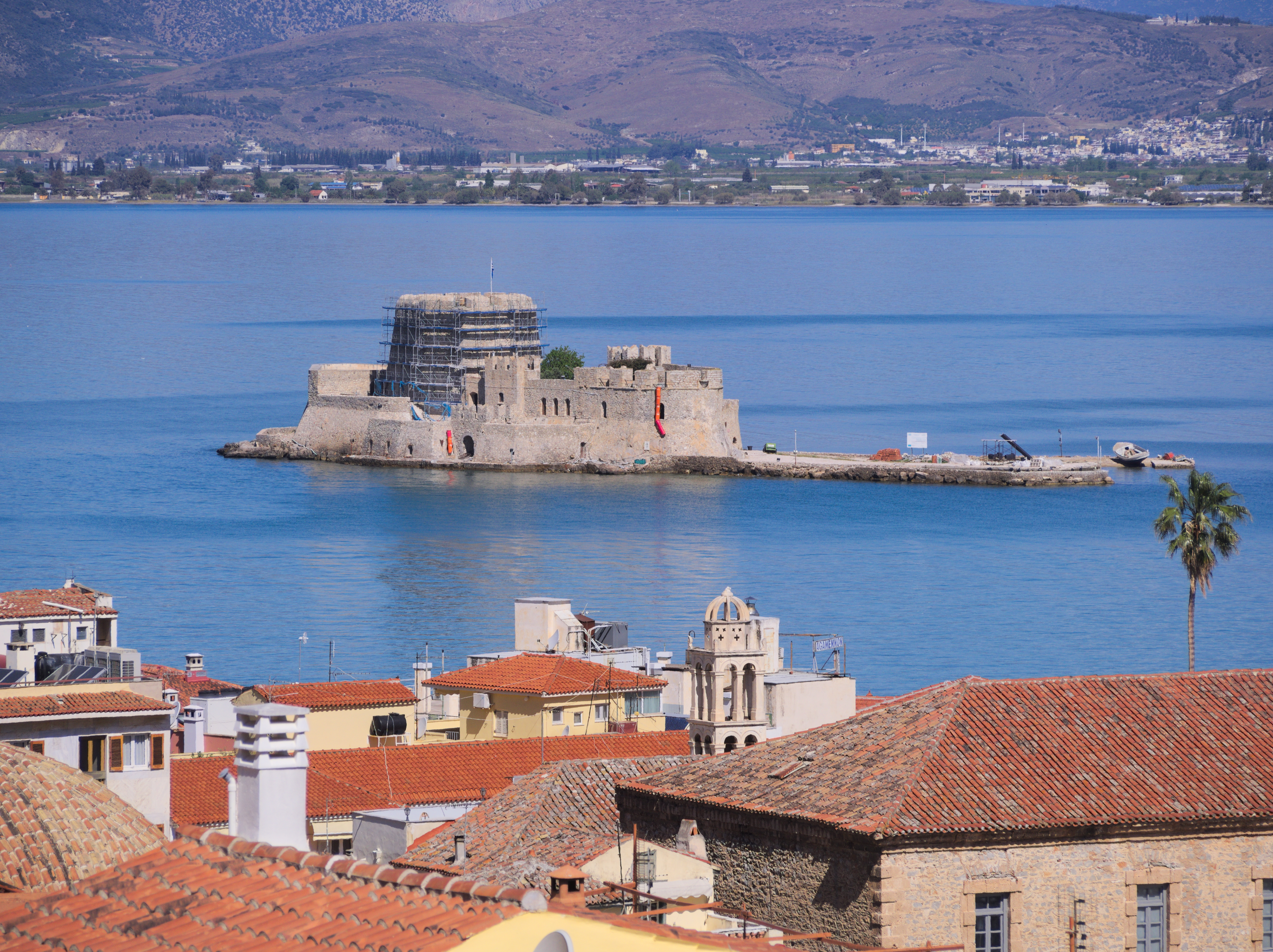
View of Nafplion, Bourtzi and Argolic Gulf

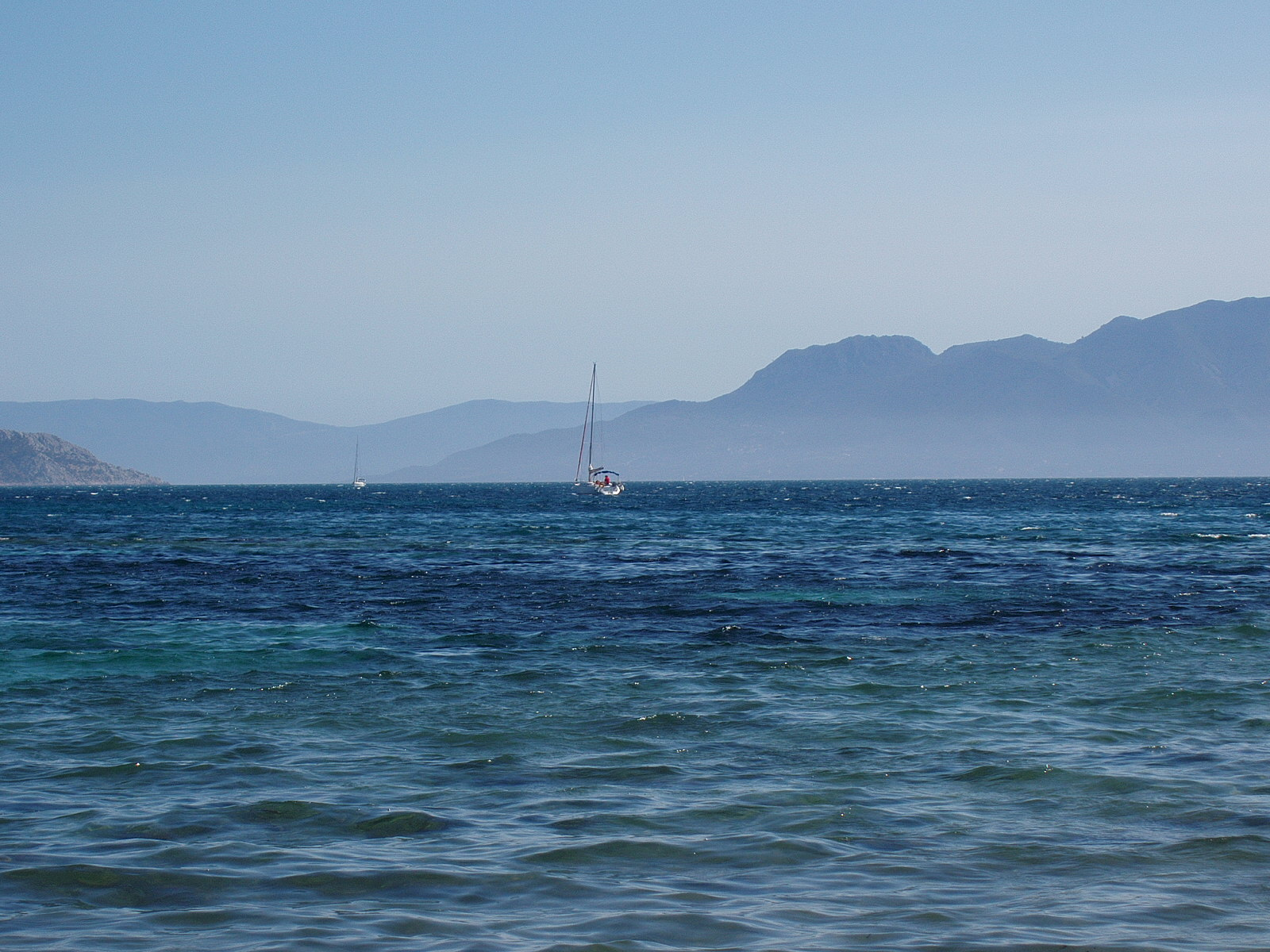
Sailboat on the Argolic Gulf near the harbour of Nafplio

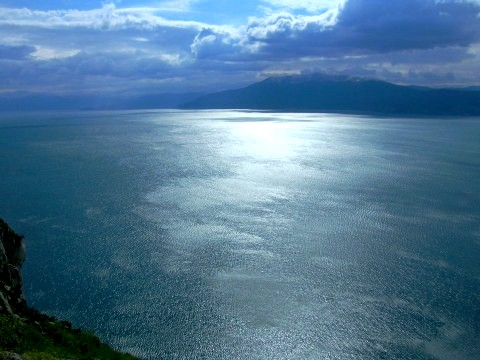
View of the Argolic Gulf from the Palamidi fortress in Nafplio, Greece
