= Mykines, Greece =

Village in Argolis, Greece

Mykines Μυκήνες
- Municipal unit
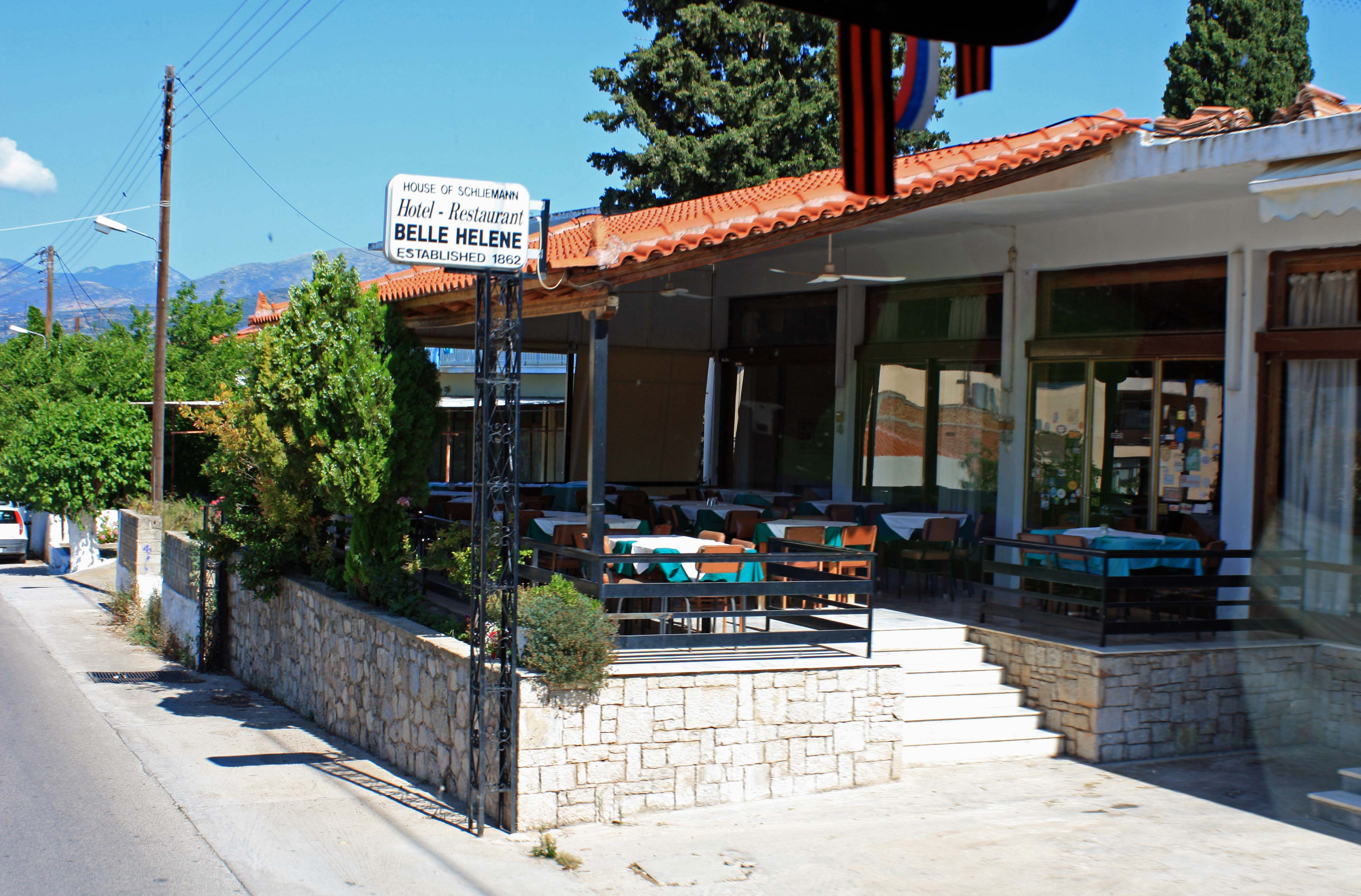
- The house of Heinrich Schliemann in Mykines, now a restaurant

- Location within the regional unit

- Location within Greece
- Coordinates: 37°43′N 22°45′E
- Country: Greece
- Administrative region: Peloponnese
- Regional unit: Argolis
- Municipality: Argos-Mykines

Area
  - Municipal unit: 159.0 km^{2} (61.4 sq mi)
- Elevation: 75 m (246 ft)

Population (2021)
  - Municipal unit: 2,885
  - Municipal unit density: 18.14/km^{2} (46.99/sq mi)
  - Community: 342
- Time zone: UTC+2 (EET)
  - Summer (DST): UTC+3 (EEST)
- Postal code: 212 00
- Area code: 27510
- Vehicle registration: AP

Mykines (Greek: Μυκήνες, romanized: Mykínes), known before 1916 as Charvati (Χαρβάτι), is a village and a former municipality in Argolis, Peloponnese, Greece. Since the 2011 local government reform it is part of the municipality Argos-Mykines, of which it is a municipal unit. The municipal unit has an area of 159.033 km^{2}. It is located 1 km west of the ancient site of Mycenae and 2 km east of the highway linking Argos and Corinth. It is 9 km north of Argos.

== Name ==
The name Mykines is the modern Greek version of Mycenae. The village is near the archaeological site of Mycenae.

== Historical population ==
Mykines was historically an Arvanite town.

Year	Community	Municipal unit
1981	440	-
1991	436	4,412
2001	422	4,349
2011	354	3,388
2021	342	2,885
