= Lyrkeia =

Lyrkeia Λυρκεία
- Municipal unit
- Location within the regional unit

- Location within Greece
- Coordinates: 37°42′N 22°33′E
- Country: Greece
- Administrative region: Peloponnese
- Regional unit: Argolis
- Municipality: Argos-Mykines

Area
  - Municipal unit: 245.2 km^{2} (94.7 sq mi)

Population (2021)
  - Municipal unit: 1,450
  - Municipal unit density: 5.91/km^{2} (15.3/sq mi)
  - Community: 263
- Time zone: UTC+2 (EET)
  - Summer (DST): UTC+3 (EEST)
- Postal code: 210 58
- Vehicle registration: AP

Lyrkeia (Greek: Λυρκεία) is a village and a former municipality in Argolis, Peloponnese, Greece. Since the 2011 local government reform it is part of the municipality Argos-Mykines, of which it is a municipal unit. The municipal unit has an area of 245.194 km^{2}. Population 1,450 (2021).
