= Argos-Mykines =

Municipality of Argos-Mykines Δήμος Άργους-Μυκηνών
- Municipality
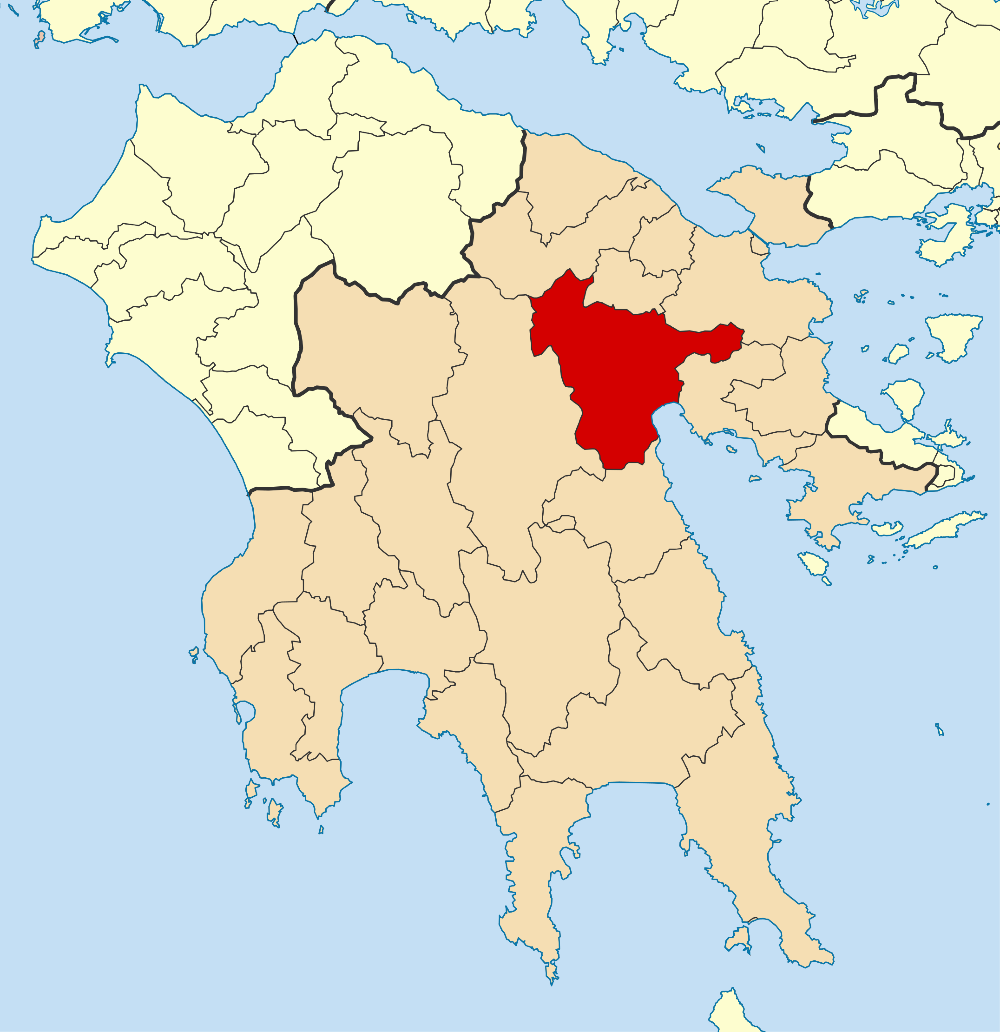
- Municipality of Argos-Mykines

- Location within Greece
- Coordinates: 37°37′N 22°43′E
- Country: Greece
- Administrative region: Peloponnese
- Regional unit: Argolis
- Seat: Argos

Government
  - Mayor: Ioannis Maltezos (since 2023)

Area
  - Municipality: 1,002.5 km^{2} (387.1 sq mi)

Population (2021)
  - Municipality: 39,994
  - Density: 39.894/km^{2} (103.33/sq mi)
- Time zone: UTC+2 (EET)
  - Summer (DST): UTC+3 (EEST)
- Website: argos.gov.gr

Argos-Mykines (Greek: Άργος-Μυκήνες) is a municipality in the Argolis regional unit, Peloponnese, Greece. The seat of the municipality is the city of Argos. The municipality has an area of 1002.508 km^{2}.

The mayor is Ioannis Maltezos, who won the election for the first time in 2023.

== Municipality ==
The municipality Argos-Mykines was formed at the 2011 local government reform (known as Kallikratis Programme) by the merger of the following 8 former municipalities, that became municipal units:

- Achladokampos
- Alea
- Argos
- Koutsopodi
- Lerna
- Lyrkeia
- Mykines
- Nea Kios

== Province ==
The province of Argos (Greek: Επαρχία Άργους) was one of the provinces of Argolis. It had the same territory as the present municipality Argos-Mykines. It was abolished in 2006.

To the west, Argos-Mykines borders to the former municipality of Mantineia, which integrated in 2011 with the municipality of Tripoli further west. To the north are the municipalities of Sikyona, Nemea and Corinth. To the east is the municipality of Nafplio. To the south, it borders with the municipality of North Kynouria.
