= Arkadiko =

Village in Epidavros municipality, Argolis, Greece

Arkadiko Αρκαδικό Arkadikon
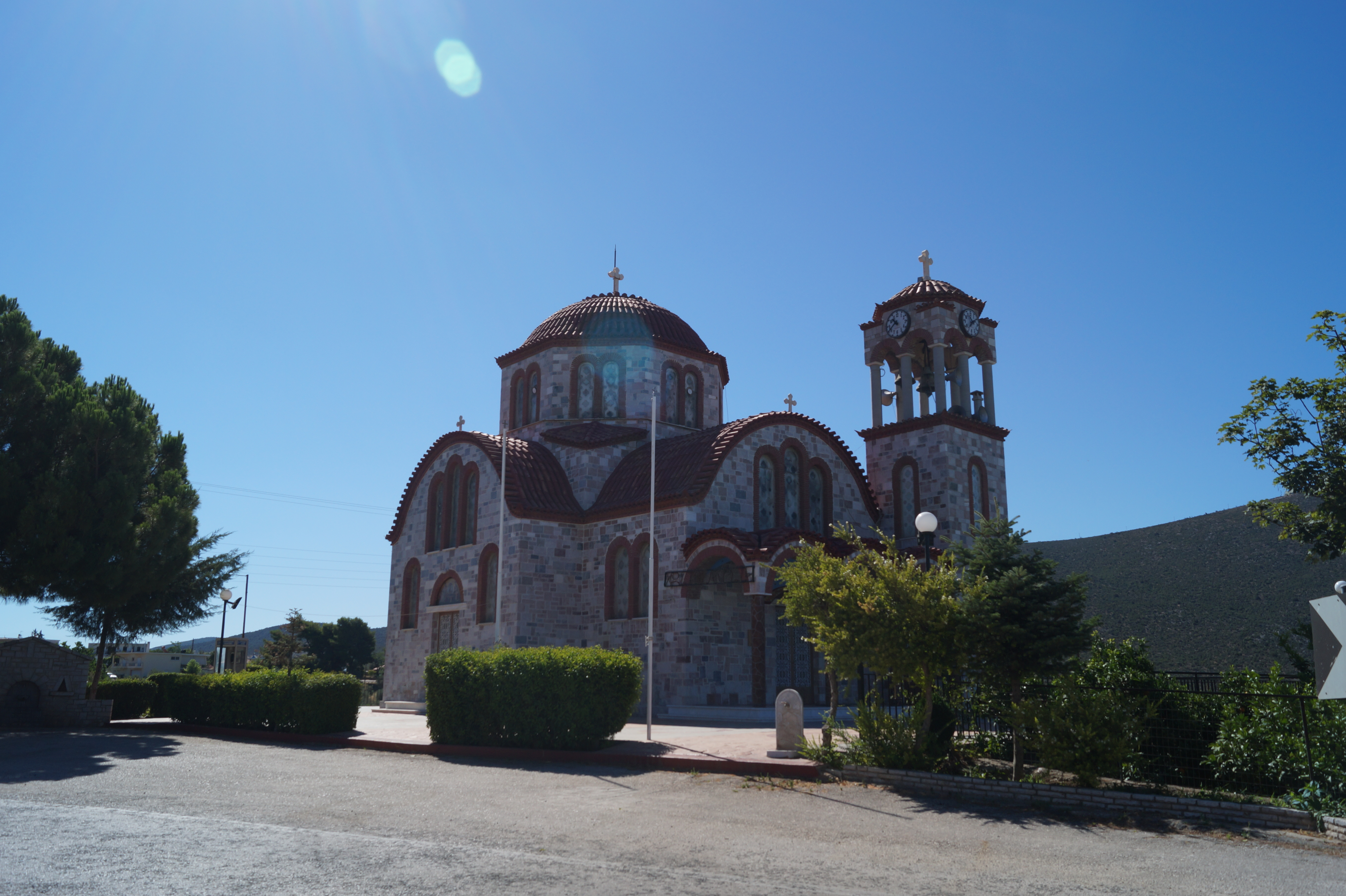
- Church of the Dormition of the Theotokos in Arkadiko

- Location in Greece
- Coordinates: 37°35′48.7″N 22°57′28.7″E
- Country: Greece
- Region: Peloponnese
- Regional unit: Argolis
- Municipality: Epidavros
- Municipal unit: Asklipiio

Area
  - Total: 18.911 km^{2} (7.302 sq mi)
- Highest elevation: 253 m (830 ft)
- Lowest elevation: 240 m (790 ft)

Population (2021)
  - Total: 177
- LAU: 41030104
- Website: epidavros.gr/municipality/arkadiko/

Arkadiko (Greek: Αρκαδικό), also Arkadikon (Αρκαδικόν), is a semi-mountainous village in the municipality of Epidavros in Argolis, Greece. It is located on the old national road Greek National Road 70 between Nafplio and Lygourio, on the southwestern foothills of Mount Arachnaio. As of the 2021 census, it has a population of 177. The community has an area of 18.911 km^{2}.

The local community consists of the main village of Arkadiko and the hamlet of Agios Ioannis, located about 1.5 km to the west. The village's former names were Prountzaika (Προυντζαίικα) or Broutzaika (Μπρουτζαίικα), an Arvanitic name indicating it was founded by Albanians who migrated to the area in the Middle Ages.

The area is rich in archaeological sights dating from the Mycenaean era to the Byzantine period.

== Sights ==
=== Acropolis of Kazarma ===
On a hill about 300 m north of the village are the ruins of a 4th-century BC fortification, known as the Acropolis of Kazarma. Situated on the ancient road from Argos to Epidaurus, it was likely built by the Argives on the border of their territory. The stone walls, 2.5 m wide and preserved to a height of 5.2 m, include four round towers. The structure was rebuilt during the Byzantine era.

=== Mycenaean Bridges ===
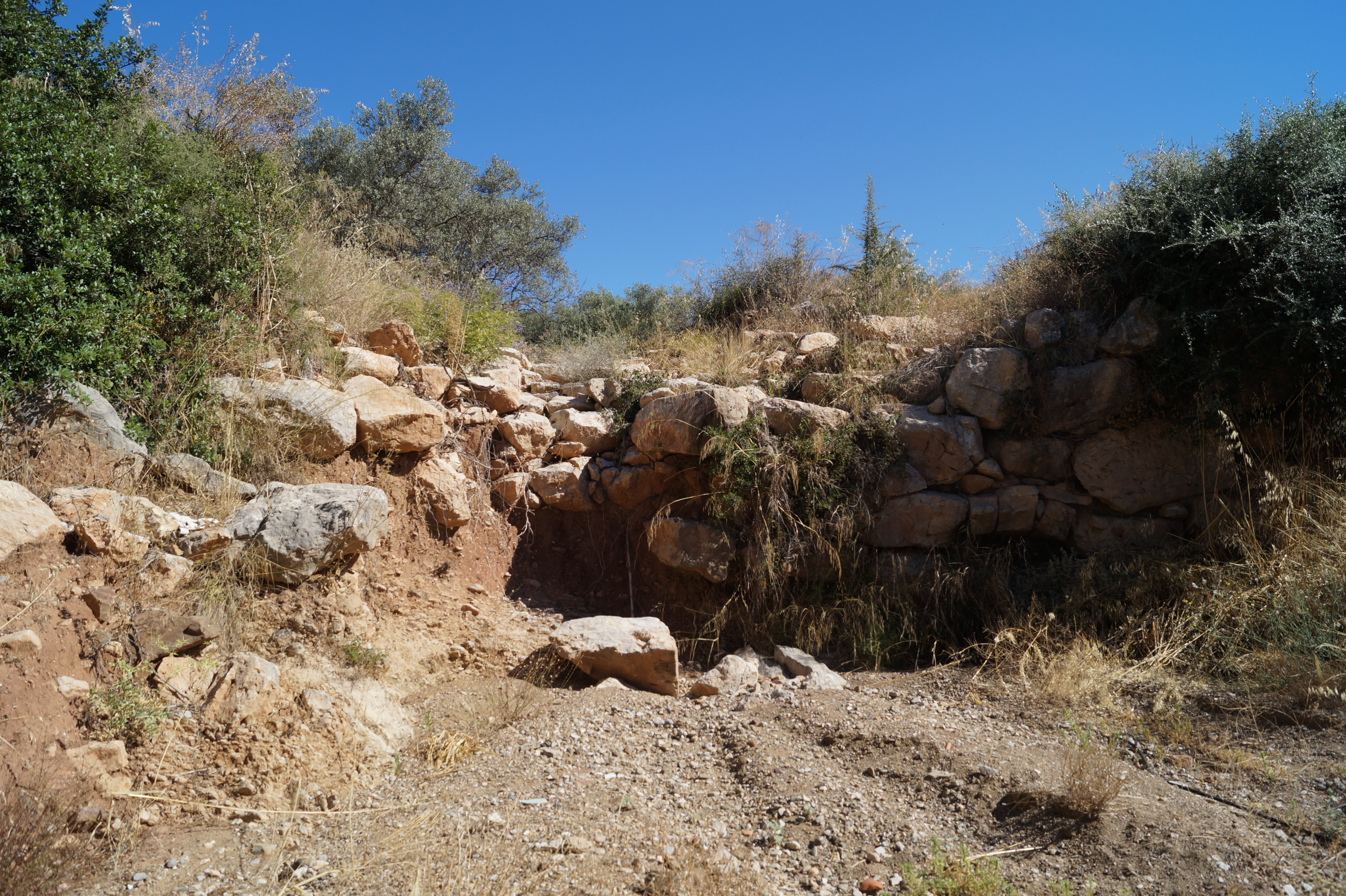
The Mycenaean Bridge of Arkadiko (Kazarma)

The area contains several Mycenaean bridges. One, known as the Arkadiko Bridge or Kazarma Bridge, is located very close to the village and is considered the oldest preserved bridge in Europe. It was built in the Mycenaean period (circa 14th century BC) as part of a road network. Another well-preserved Mycenaean bridge is located 160 m west of Agios Ioannis, from which a hiking trail leads to a third bridge about 1 km further west.

=== Kazarma tholos tomb ===
The Kazarma tholos tomb is a Mycenaean subterranean tholos tomb from the 2nd millennium BC, in the Argolis region of Greece. It is located in Agios Ioannis (formerly Kazarma), on the southern slope of the Kazarma hill, and lies about 8 m north of the road to Lygourio and 1.5 km north of the national road EO 70 (Corinth–Argos). About 300 m to the north rises the Acropolis of Kazarma. According to the classification by Alan Wace, the tomb belongs to the first tholos group and dates to the Late Helladic (LH II A) period.

=== Other Sights ===
- The Kastraki castle is located about 1 km northwest of Arkadiko.
- The Byzantine church of Agia Marina (Αγία Μαρίνα) is located about 500 m north of the Kazarma bridge, near the ruins of a watermill.

== Population ==
The population of Arkadiko saw a general increase over the 20th century, peaking in 2001, but has since declined.

Census Year	Population
1991	308
2001	337
2011	241
2021	177

== Sources ==
- "Ergebnisse der Volkszählung 2011 beim Nationalen Statistischen Dienst Griechenlands (ΕΛ.ΣΤΑΤ)" [Results of the 2011 Population Census from the National Statistical Service of Greece (EL.STAT)] (in Greek). Hellenic Statistical Service. Archived from the original on 2015-11-13.
- "Πίνακας αποτελεσμάτων ΜΟΝΙΜΟΥ Πληθυσμού κατά αστικότητα, ορεινότητα, έκταση" [Table of results of PERMANENT Population by urbanity, altitude, area] (in Greek). Ελληνική Στατιστική Αρχή. Archived from the original on 2021-07-22.
- "Απογραφή πληθυσμού - κατοικιών της 18ης μαρτίου 2001 (μόνιμος πληθυσμός)" [Population - housing census of 18 March 2001 (permanent population)] (PDF) (in Greek). Piraeus: Εθνική στατιστική υπηρεσία της Ελλάδας. 2009. p. 351. Archived from the original (PDF) on 2015-09-21.
- "Ακρόπολη Καζάρμας. Ιστορικό" [Acropolis of Kazarma. History] (in Greek). Υπουργείο Πολιτισμού και Αθλητισμού. 2012. Archived from the original on 2021-10-21.
- "Μόνιμος και Πραγματικός Πληθυσμός της Ελλάδος. Σύνολο Ελλάδος, νομοί, δήμοι/κοινότητες, δημοτικα/κοινοτικά διαμερίσμα και οικσί. Απογραφές πληθυσμού 2001 και 1991" [Permanent and Real Population of Greece. Total Greece, prefectures, municipalities/communities, municipal/community districts and settlements. Population censuses 2001 and 1991] (in Greek). Ελληνική Στατιστική Αρχή. Archived from the original on 2006-07-16.
- "Αρκαδικό" [Arkadiko]. Epidavros Οfficial website (in Greek).
- "Μπρουτζαίικα Αργολίδος" [Broutzaika, Argolis]. ΕΕΤΑΑ (in Greek).
- "Αρκαδικό ΑΡΓΟΛΙΔΑΣ, Δήμος ΕΠΙΔΑΥΡΟΥ". buk.gr (in Greek).
- "ΦΕΚ αποτελεσμάτων ΜΟΝΙΜΟΥ πληθυσμού 2021" [FEK results of PERMANENT population 2021] (in Greek). p. 21892.
- "Ακρόπολη Καζάρμας - Εφορεία Αρχαιοτήτων Αργολίδας" [Acropolis of Kazarma - Ephorate of Antiquities of Argolis]. www.argolisculture.gr (in Greek).
- Antonaccio, Carla M. (1995). An Archaeology of Ancestors. Tomb Cult and Hero Cult in Early Greece. Lanham: Rowman & Littlefield. ISBN 0-8476-7941-1.
- Protonotariou-Deilaki, Evangelia (1968). "Θολωτός τάφος Καζάρμας" [Tholos tomb of Kazarma]. Αρχαιολογικά Ανάλεκτα εξ Αθηνών (in Greek). 3 (1): 236–238.
