= Kazarma tholos tomb =

Mycenaean tholos tomb in Argolis, Greece

- Tholos of Kazarma
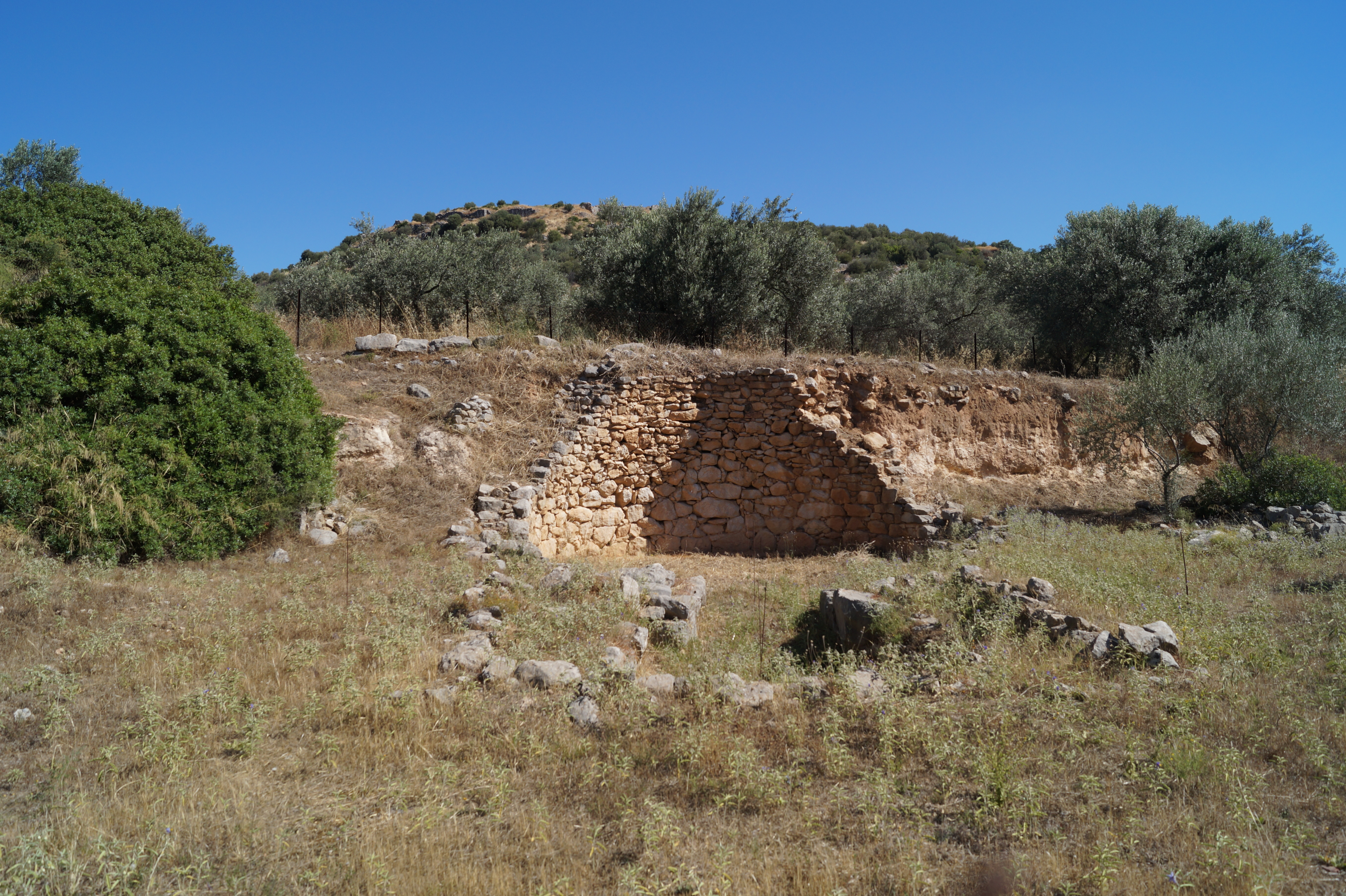
- The dromos and entrance to the Kazarma tholos tomb
- Interactive map of Kazarma tholos tomb
- 37°35′37.4″N 22°56′33.6″E
- Periods: LH IIA–IIIA1 (approx. 1500–1370 BC)
- Cultures: Mycenaean
- Location: Agios Ioannis, Argolis
- Region: Peloponnese, Greece

Site notes
- Archaeologists: Spyridon Marinatos

The Kazarma tholos tomb is a Mycenaean subterranean tholos tomb from the 2nd millennium BC, in the Argolis region of Greece. It is located in Agios Ioannis (formerly Kazarma), on the southern slope of the Kazarma hill, and lies about 8 m north of the road to Lygourio and 1.5 km north of the national road EO 70 (Corinth–Argos). About 300 m to the north rises the Acropolis of Kazarma. According to the classification by Alan Wace, the tomb belongs to the first tholos group and dates to the Late Helladic (LH II A) period.

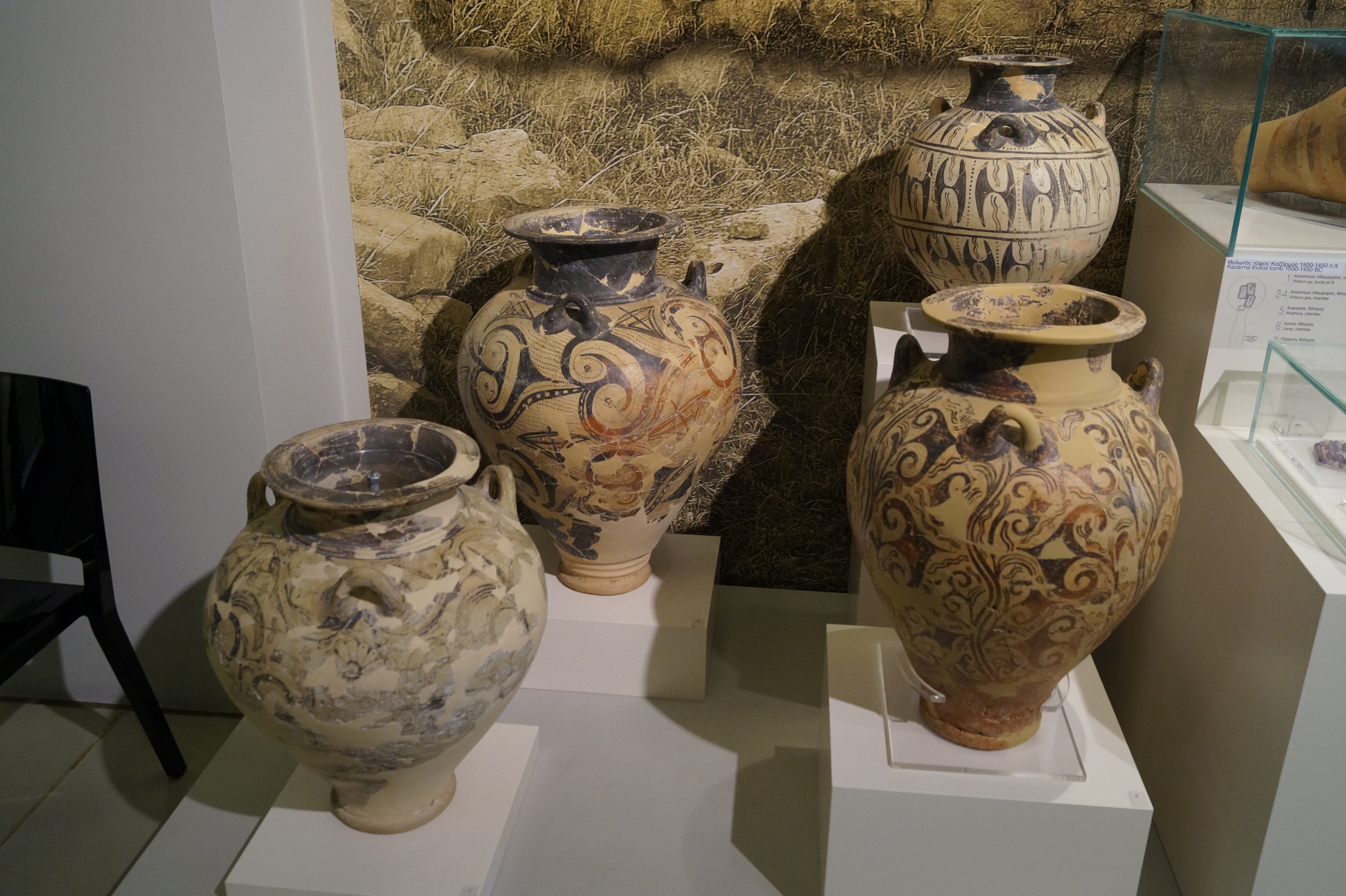
Pottery from the tomb

== Description ==
The dromos, about 5 m long and 2.50 m wide, led from the south to the entrance of the tomb. The entrance corridor (stomion) had a width of 1.55 m and a length of 2.50 m. Only the foundation walls of both the dromos and the stomion are preserved. Of the tomb's cupola, only the rear part is preserved to a height of 4 m. The dome originally had a diameter of 7.20 m and a height of about 7 m. The lower part of the dome is similar in construction to the Cyclopean Tomb in Mycenae. It was built from large stones, while smaller stones were used for the upper layers. Three shaft graves were dug into the soft bedrock floor, which were covered with large stone slabs. A woman was interred in Shaft I, and one man each in Shafts II and III. The deceased were presumably a local elite who controlled the road from Epidaurus to Argos and found their final resting place here in the period from 1500 to 1450 BC. High-quality pottery in the Palace Style, vessels from LH I and early LH II, jewelry, and bronze weapons were found as grave goods.

The tomb continued to be used after that. It is presumed that the tomb was used by the same family for over 250 years. At the end of its use (LH III C, beginning of the 12th century BC), two bodies were buried in the chamber without grave goods, and a large fire was lit. The tomb was permanently sealed, and a calf and a small skyphos were sacrificed on a stone heap in front of the entrance. As finds under the tomb show, the site where it was built was already settled in the Early Helladic period. It was excavated from September 1968 on the property of the Giannoulis brothers under the direction of Spyridon Marinatos. The finds are located in the archaeological museum of Nafplio.

== Sources ==
- Antonaccio, Carla M. (1995). An Archaeology of Ancestors. Tomb Cult and Hero Cult in Early Greece. Lanham: Rowman & Littlefield. ISBN 0-8476-7941-1.
- Dirlik, Nil (2012). The Tholos Tombs of Mycenaean Greece (PDF) (MA thesis). Uppsala University.
- Krystalli, Kalliopi (1968). "Καζάρμα" [Kazarma]. Αρχαιολογικόν Δελτίον (in Greek). 22 (1967): Chronika. Athens: 179–180.
- Protonotariou-Deilaki, Evangelia (1968). "Θολωτός τάφος Καζάρμας" [Tholos tomb of Kazarma]. Αρχαιολογικά Ανάλεκτα εξ Αθηνών (in Greek). 3 (1): 236–238.
- Protonotariou-Deilaki, Evangelia (1969). "Άνασκαφή θολωτού μυκηναϊκού τάφου" [Excavation of a Mycenaean tholos tomb]. Archaiologikon Deltion (in Greek). 24 (B1): 104–105.
