= Greek National Road 10 =

Trunk road in Greece

National Road 10
- Εθνική Οδός 10
- Route of the EO10 road, in blue

Route information
- Length: 60.5 km (37.6 mi)
- Existed: 24 July 1995–present

Major junctions
- North end: Isthmia
- South end: Ancient Theatre of Epidaurus

Location
- Country: Greece
- Regions: Peloponnese
- Primary destinations: Isthmia; Kato Almyri; Nea Epidavros; Ancient Theatre of Epidaurus

Highway system
- Highways in Greece; Motorways; National roads
← EO9a	→ EO12

Greek National Road 10 (Greek: Εθνική Οδός 10), abbreviated as the EO10, is a national road in the Peloponnese region of Greece. Created in 1995, the EO10 runs between Isthmia (near Corinth) to the north and the Ancient Theatre of Epidaurus to the south.

== Route ==
The EO10 is officially defined as a north–south road in the Argolis and Corinthia regional units: the road runs between Isthmia (near Corinth) to the north and the Ancient Theatre of Epidaurus to the south, passing through Kato Almyri and Nea Epidavros. The EO10 connects with the A8 and EO7 to the north, and the EO70 at the southern end.

== History ==
Ministerial Decision DMEO/e/oik/779 of 24 July 1995 created the EO10, and classified it as part of the secondary national road network. The EO10 number originated from the Register of National Roads, published by the National Statistical Service of Greece (ESYE, now the Hellenic Statistical Authority), and is one of a few numbers from the publication to see general (as opposed to just statistical) use.
