= Epidaurus (disambiguation) =

Epidaurus was an ancient Greek city in the Saronic Gulf, containing the sanctuary of Asclepius.

Epidaurus may also refer to:

- Epidaurus (mythology), once believed to have founded Epidaurus
- Epidaurus (Dalmatia), a Greek colony in the eastern Adriatic - modern Cavtat
- Epidauros (Stobreč), a Greek colony in the eastern Adriatic - modern Stobreč
- Epidaurus Limera, an ancient Greek city near Monemvasia, Laconia
- Epidavros Limira, a former province of Laconia, Greece
- Palaia Epidavros, a town in Greece
- Nea Epidavros, a village in Greece

== See also ==
- Sanctuary of Asclepius, Epidaurus
