= Theatre of Palaia Epidavros =

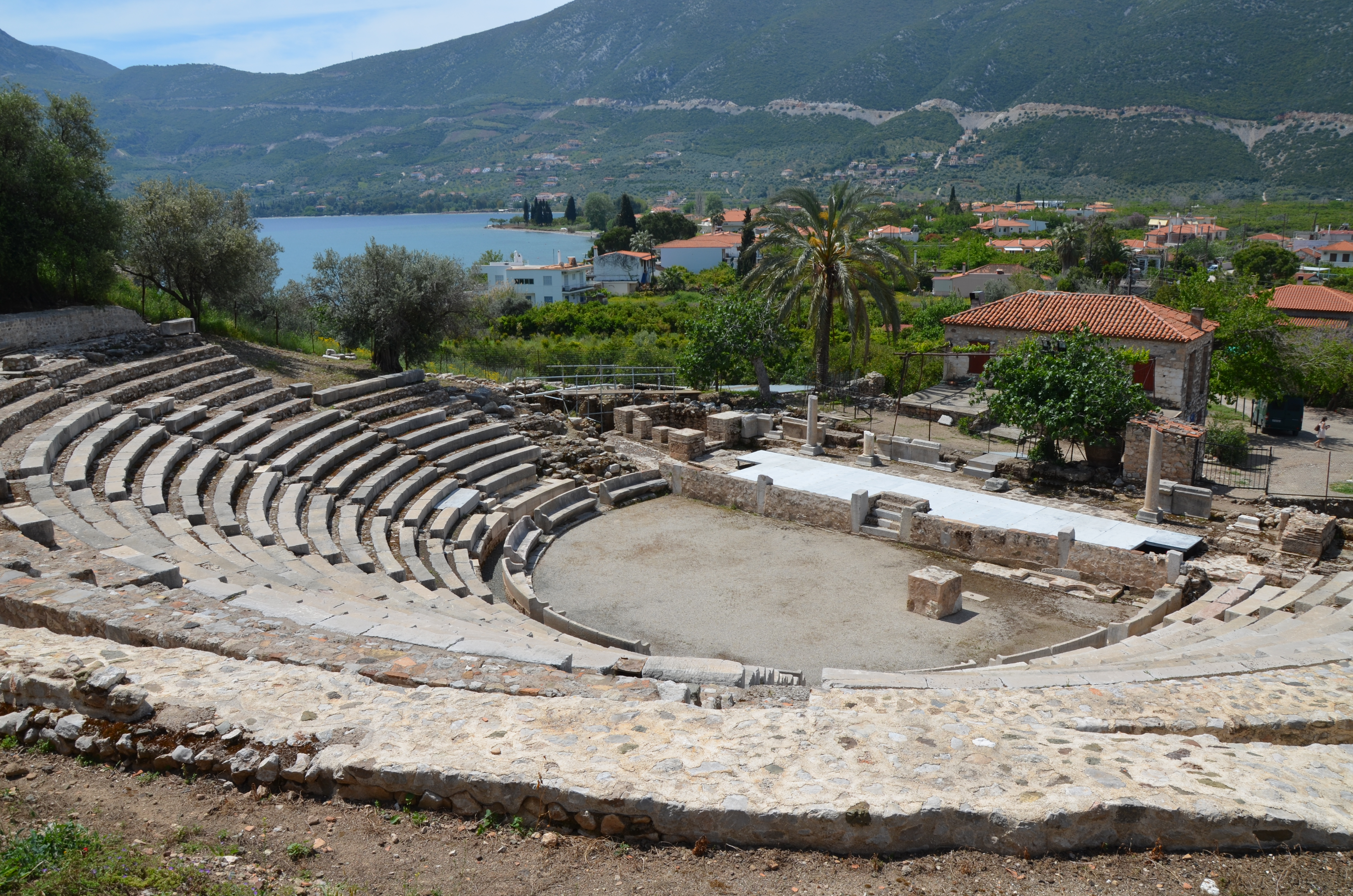
Panoramic view of the interior of the theatre of Palaia Epidavros

The Theatre of Palaia Epidavros (Greek: Θέατρο Αρχαίας Πόλεως Επιδαύρου), also known as the Small Theatre of Epidauros, is an ancient Greek theatre, located on the slope of the acropolis of the ancient city of Epidaurus, Greece, near the present-day village of Palaia Epidavros.

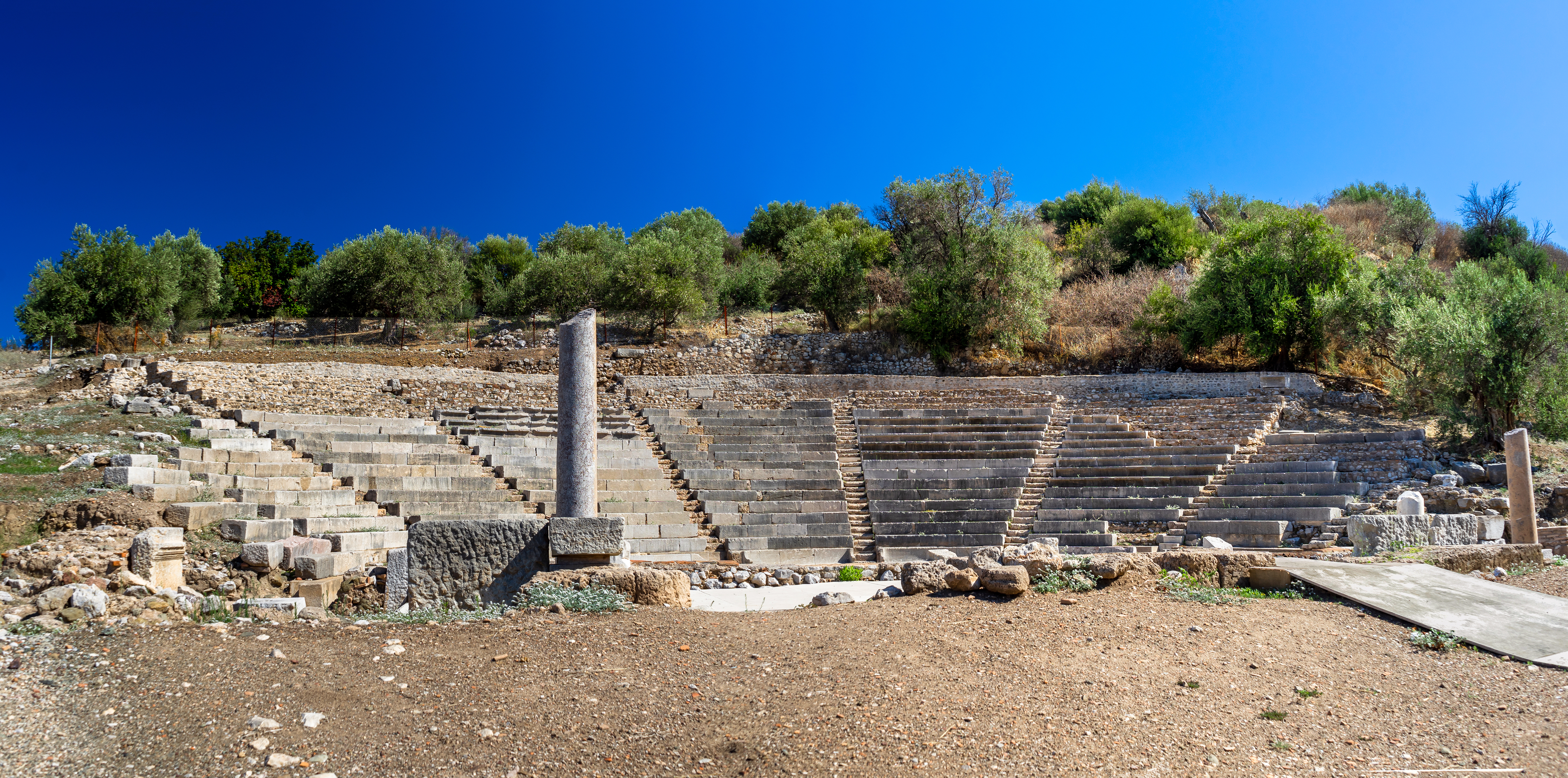
View of the Small Theatre of Epidavros

The theatre was built in successive phases, the first of which dates back to the Classical period and continued until the Hellenistic period. Further architectural modifications also took place during the Roman period. The site of the theatre was discovered in 1970, and organised archaeological excavations on the site began in 1972. At the same time, other smaller-scale archaeological excavations were carried out on the site in 1989.

A typical example of ancient Greek theatre, this theatre is semi-circular in shape, with an orchestra at its centre. Initially circular in shape, the orchestra was transformed into a semi-circular shape during the Roman period. To date, 18 rows of seats have been uncovered within the theatre, which is divided into nine sections separated by rows of vertically arranged steps. The seating capacity is estimated at at least 2,000 spectators. The theatre is in a relatively good state of preservation and is undergoing a number of restoration works.

This theatre should not be confused with the larger and better-known Theatre of Epidaurus, located near the Asclepion of Epidaurus. Nowadays, the theatre is used as a venue for theatrical performances at festivals such as the Athens-Epidaurus Festival.
