= Kofini Dam =

Dam in Greece

The Kifini Dam (greek Φράγμα της Τίρυνθας), also known as the Tiryns Dam, is a man-made dam constructed during the Mycenaean Period of 1260 B.C.E to divert the Lakissa River in Greece (Argolis, Nea Tirintha, 37°36′31″N 22°50′39″E). It is located 900 m north of Agios Adrianos, 2 km east of Nea Tiryntha and 4 km east of the Mycenaean Palace of Tiryns.

== History ==
Until the beginning of the 12th century BC, the Lakissa River flowed from the east, north past the Profitis Ilias hill and about 1 km further west, south past the castle of Tiryns.

A mudslide, possibly triggered by an earthquake, buried part of the Tiryns settlement at the end of the Late Helladic III B2, south of the Palace. The mudslide permanently changed the course of the river, causing it to flow north past Tiryns.

Presumably to prevent another flooding early in the Late Helladic III C, the old river bed was closed and a dam about 10 m high and 300 m long was built to reroute the Lakissa River towards the Manessi riverbed, south past the Profitis Ilias hill and then north past the Agia Kyriaki hill, emptying into the Argolic Gulf about 1.5 km south of Tiryns.
