= Greek National Road 68 =

Trunk road in Greece

National Road 68
- Εθνική Οδός 68
- Route of the EO68 road, in blue

Route information
- Length: 3.77 km (2.34 mi)
- Existed: 9 July 1963–present

Major junctions
- West end: Fichti
- East end: Mycenae

Location
- Country: Greece
- Regions: Peloponnese
- Primary destinations: Fichti; Mycenae

Highway system
- Highways in Greece; Motorways; National roads
← EO67	→ EO69

National Road 68 (Greek: Εθνική Οδός 68), abbreviated as the EO68, is a national road in the Peloponnese region of Greece. The EO68 is a short road that connects the archaeological site of Mycenae to the Greek national road network.

== Route ==
The EO68 is officially defined as a short road in the Argolis regional unit, branching off the EO7 in Fichti and heading east towards the archaeological site of Mycenae, passing through the village of Mykines. The EO68 also meets with Argolis Provincial Road 19 at Mykines.

== History ==
Ministerial Decision G25871 of 9 July 1963 created the EO68 from the old EO63, which existed by royal decree from 1955 until 1963, and followed the same route as the current EO68.
