= Athens Epidaurus Festival =

Cultural festival in Greece

Athens - Epidaurus Festival
- Genre: all types
- Dates: May – October
- Locations: Athens, Epidaurus, Greece
- Coordinates: 37.97084°N 23.72452°E
- Years active: 1955–present
- Leader: Katerina Evangelatos (Director 2019-2025)

Athens – Epidaurus Festival is an annual arts festival that takes place in Athens and Epidaurus, from May to October. It is one of the most famous festivals in Greece.

It is held every year during the summer months (Fridays and Saturdays in July and August), in part in the ancient theatre of Epidaurus, on the archaeological site of the Asclepion. The festival includes musical, theatrical and other cultural events. They include performances of tragedies by Aeschylus, Sophocles and Euripides, as well as surviving comedies by Aristophanes; some performances consist simply of revivals of ancient myths or contemporary plays written on the basis of ancient dramas.

== History ==
=== Epidaurus Festival ===
The Epidaurus Festival (Greek: Φεστιβάλ Επιδαύρου), also known as the Epidávria (Greek: Επιδαύρια), takes place in the ancient theatre of Epidaurus, which has a capacity of 10,000 and is renowned for its special acoustics. It was founded in 1955, at the same time as the Athens Festival, thanks to the efforts of the then Minister of the Presidency and future Prime Minister, Georgios Rallis. During its first years of existence, the Hellenic Tourism Organisation was responsible for managing the Epidaurus Festival as well as the Athens Festival.

It was officially inaugurated on 19 June 1955 with a performance of Euripides' Hecuba (directed by Alexis Minotis with Katina Paxinou in the role of the same name) and devoted itself to performances of ancient tragedies and, from 1957, to performances of ancient comedies by the National Theatre, where Alexis Solomos revived the plays of Aristophanes, starting with Lysistrata. In 1959, Karolos Koun's performance of Aristophanes' Birds, with music by Manos Hadjidakis and sets and costumes by Yannis Tsarouchis, aroused both public approval and opposition and was finally withdrawn following government intervention.

For some twenty years, the performances at Epidaurus were entrusted to the National Theatre of Greece and to actors such as Paxinou, Minotis, Anna Synodinou, Mary Aroni and Nezer. In 1960 and 1961, Maria Callas appeared in Epidaurus in Norma by Vincenzo Bellini (1960) and Medea by Luigi Cherubini (1961), respectively. In 1965, the Damnation of Faust by the Paris Opera, directed and choreographed by Maurice Béjart, and Giuseppe Verdi's Requiem by Herbert von Karajan and the Berlin Philharmonic Orchestra were performed. During the Greek junta, the festival stagnated and there was a general tendency towards introspection and withdrawal.

During the Metapolitefsi period, and more specifically in 1975, companies from outside the National Theatre were allowed to perform on the stage of the Ancient Theatre for the first time, including the Karolos Koun Art Theatre (Birds) and the State Theatre of Northern Greece (Electra). In 1980, the Amphi-Theatre of Spiros Evangelatos appeared at the festival with Menander's Epitrepontes, as did the Theatrical Organization of Cyprus with Euripides' Suppliants, directed by Nikos Charalampous. Two years later (1982), Peter Hall presented Aeschylus' Oresteia with the Royal National Theatre, becoming the first foreign director to take part in the Epidaurus Festival.

From its beginnings to the present day, the Epidaurus Festival has welcomed the greatest Greek directors and actors, as well as many other great artists, including Yiannis Moralis, Yannis Tsarouchis, George Vakalo, Manos Hadjidakis, Míkis Theodorakis, Yannis Markopoulos, Stavros Xarchakos and Iannis Xenakis. There are also performances by leading foreign companies and collaborations with foreign directors, actors and other collaborators, including Peter Hall, Peter Stein, Tadashi Suzuki, Luca Ronconi, Valery Fokin, Thomas Ostermeier, Pina Bausch, Montserrat Caballé, José Carreras, Fiona Shaw, Gérard Depardieu and Kevin Spacey. Festival performances often become a point of wider discussion in the public sphere, generating acclaim or mixed reviews.

Alongside the Epidaurus Festival, performances (initially solely musical and later theatrical) take place at the Theatre of Palaia Epidavros. The institution was launched on an experimental basis in 1995 with the "Musical July" (Greek: Μουσικός Ιούλιος) and met with great success, leading to its becoming a permanent fixture, and integrated with the Athens-Epidaurus Festival.

=== Athens ===
The director Dinos Giannopoulos undertook the organization of the first Athens Festival, on commission by then-Minister of Culture.

=== Athens Epidaurus ===
Today, the joint festival is organised by the "Hellenic Festival S.A." company. Between 2016 and 2019, Vangelis Theodoropoulos served as the artistic director following the resignation of Jan Fabre. Since 2019, Katerina Evangelatos has been the festival's Artistic Director. In 2025, Director Michael Marmarinos has been appointed the festival's Artistic Director.

== Notable moments ==
Over the years, the Athens Festival has been able to host numerous notable groups and artists.^{,}

- 1955: the first year of the Festival, Dimitris Mitropoulos and the New York Philharmonic play Nikos Skalkottas' 36 Greek dances.
- 1958: The Athens Philharmonic Orchestra with Gina Bachauer.
- 1959: The New York Philharmonic directed by Leonard Bernstein.
- 1961: Maria Callas performs Norma by Vincenzo Bellini and Médée by Luigi Cherubini.
- 1961: The Royal Ballet (Covent Garden) with Margot Fonteyn.
- 1962: The Berlin Philharmonic directed by Herbert von Karajan.
- 1963: The Ballet of the 20th Century under Maurice Béjart.
- 1963: Ballet performance with Rudolf Nureyev and Margot Fonteyn.
- 1967: The Los Angeles Philharmonic directed by Zubin Mehta.
- 1976: Sviatoslav Richter recital.
- 1979: The Alvin Ailey American Dance Theater.
- 1981: The Vienna Opera Ball with Rudolf Nureyev.
- 1982: Aeschylus' Oresteia, on Epidaurus, under the direction of Peter Hall.
- 1982: The Karlsruhe symphony orchestra with Dimitris Sgouros.
- 1983: The Martha Graham Dance Company.
- 1984: The Ballet National de Marseille under Roland Petit.
- 1984: The Zurich Opera with Agnes Baltsa and José Carreras.
- 1985: The Royal Opera (Covent Garden).
- 1985: The National Symphony Orchestra (Washington) under Mstislav Rostropovich.
- 1988: The New York Philharmonic directed by Zubin Mehta.
- 1989: Manos Hatzidakis with Nana Mouskouri
- 1989: The Royal Danish Ballet.
- 1990: The Leningrad Philharmonic Orchestra under Yuri Temirkanov.
- 1991: Luciano Pavarotti recital at Odeon of Herodes Atticus.
- 1992: Montserrat Caballé recital.
- 1993: The Vienna Philharmonic directed by Riccardo Muti.
- 1993: José Carreras recital at Odeon of Herodes Atticus and the Ancient Theatre of Epidaurus.

== Venues ==
- Odeon of Herodes Atticus
- Athens Concert Hall
- "Technopolis", Gazi
- "Peiraios 260"
- "THEATRON", Cultural Center "Hellenic Cosmos"
- "Bios"
- Benaki Museum Pireos Street Annexe
- "Scholeion Theatre", Moschato
- Epidaurus Ancient Theatre
- Ancient Epidaurus Little Theatre
