= Anaxicrates =

Anaxicrates (Ancient Greek: Ἀναξικράτης) was a Greek writer of uncertain date, one of whose statements is compared with one of Cleitodemus. He wrote a work on Argolis.
