= Greek National Road 70 =

Trunk road in Greece

National Road 70
- Εθνική Οδός 70
- Route of the EO70 road, in blue

Route information
- Length: 51.5 km (32.0 mi)
- Existed: 9 July 1963–present

Major junctions
- West end: Argos
- East end: Ancient Theatre of Epidaurus; Palaia Epidavros

Location
- Country: Greece
- Regions: Peloponnese
- Primary destinations: Argos; Nafplio; Ancient Theatre of Epidaurus / Palaia Epidavros

Highway system
- Highways in Greece; Motorways; National roads
| ← EO69 | → EO71 |

Greek National Road 70 (Greek: Εθνική Οδός 70), abbreviated as the EO70, is a national road in the Peloponnese region of Greece. The EO70 runs between Argos to the west and Palaia Epidavros to the east, with a branch to the Ancient Theatre of Epidaurus.

== Route ==
The EO70 is officially defined as an east–west road within the Argolis regional unit. The main road runs between Argos to the west and Palaia Epidavros to the east: at Lygourio, there is a branch to Ancient Theatre of Epidaurus. The EO70 connects with the EO7 in Argos, and with the EO10 to the east.

== History ==
Ministerial Decision G25871 of 9 July 1963 created the EO70 from the old EO64, which existed by royal decree from 1955 until 1963, and followed the same route as the current EO70. Ministerial Decision DMEO/e/oik/779 of 24 July 1995 classified the EO70 as part of the secondary national road network.
