= Palaia Epidavros =

Town in Argolis, Greece

Palaia Epidavros Παλαιά Επίδαυρος
- Settlement
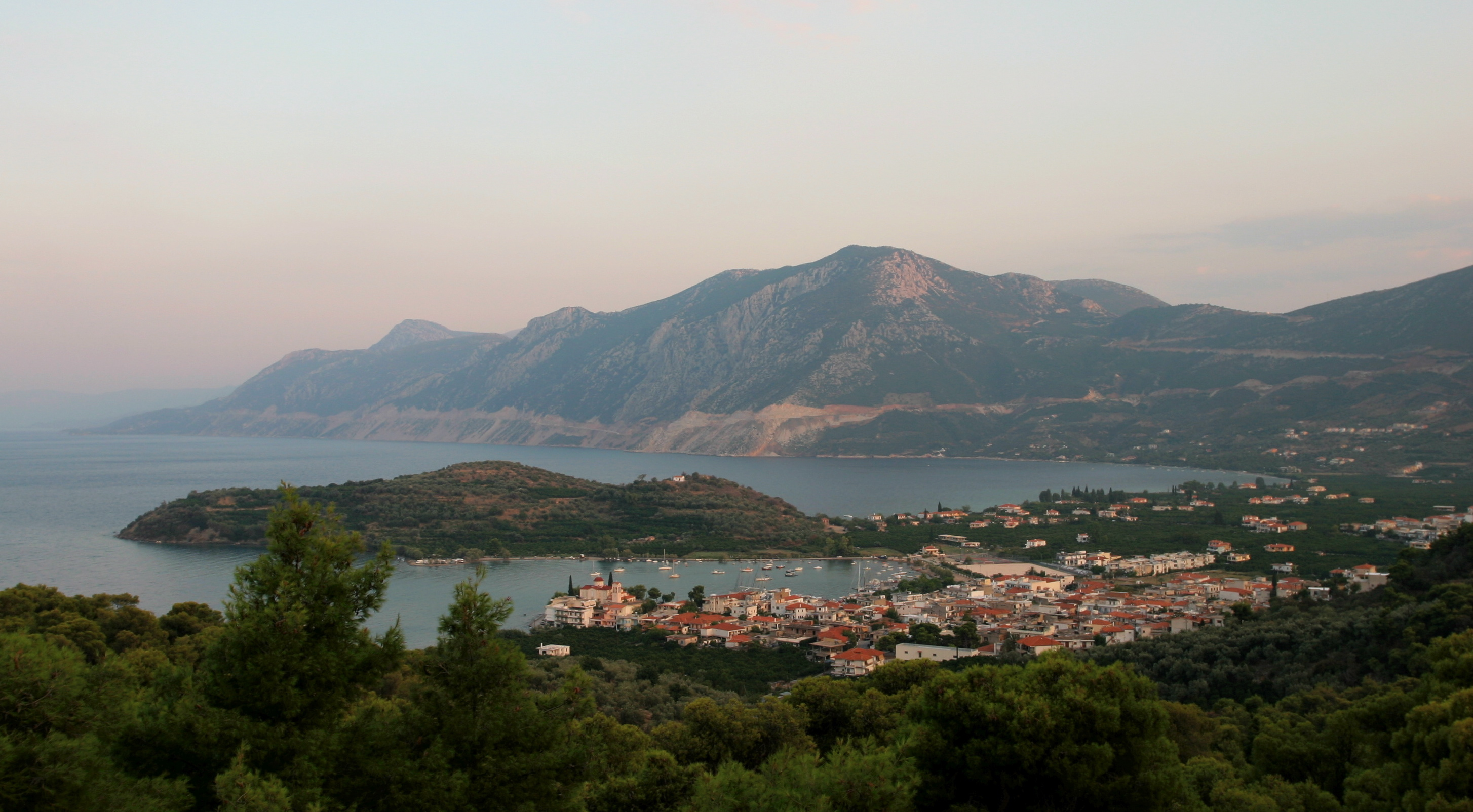

- Location within Greece
- Coordinates: 37°39′N 23°09′E
- Country: Greece
- Administrative region: Peloponnese
- Regional unit: Argolis

Population (2021)
  - Community: 1,713
- Time zone: UTC+2 (EET)
  - Summer (DST): UTC+3 (EEST)
- Vehicle registration: AP

Palaia Epidavros or Palaia Epidauros (also Palea Epidavros and Palea Epidauros; Greek: Παλαιά Επίδαυρος) is a small town in the Argolis prefecture of the Peloponnese. Today also called Archaia Epidauros (Αρχαία Επίδαυρος), it is built in the same place where the ancient city of Epidauros was located, on top of and surrounding a small peninsula between two bays, on the coast of the Saronic gulf. It is situated 34 km to the east of Nafplio and 60 km to the south of Corinth.

== Description ==
At the foot of the Akropolis of Ancient Epidauros is located the so-called "Small Theatre of Epidauros", not to be confused with the more famous theatre at the Sanctuary of Asklepios in Epidauros, some 10 km to the south-west (Theatre of Epidaurus). This smaller theatre was built in the middle of the 4th century BCE. It was re-discovered in 1970 and excavated in 1972. Its capacity is 2000 seats. Every Summer cultural events take place in the theatre, under the title of "Musical July" but better known as a part of the much bigger annual "Athens-Epidauros Festival".

Since Palea Epidauros is a coastal town, there are several beaches. The most famous is Kalamaki Beach. Other beaches are Polemarcha beach and Gialasi beach.

== Historical population ==
Census	Settlement	Community
1991	1,406	-
2001	1,733	1,935
2011	1,618	1,932
2021	1,540	1,713
