= Greek National Road 69 =

Trunk road in Greece

National Road 69
- Εθνική Οδός 69
- Route of the EO69 road, in blue

Route information
- Length: 39.0 km (24.2 mi)
- Existed: 9 July 1963–present

Major junctions
- North end: Thasos (Limenas)
- South end: Limenaria

Location
- Country: Greece
- Regions: Eastern Macedonia and Thrace
- Primary destinations: Thasos; Limenaria

Highway system
- Highways in Greece; Motorways; National roads
← EO68	→ EO70

Greek National Road 69 (Greek: Εθνική Οδός 69), abbreviated as the EO69, is a national road that runs along the north and west coast of the island of Thasos.

== Route ==
The EO69 is officially defined as a semi-circular road on the island of Thasos: the road starts in the town of Thasos (described in the 1963 decree as the Port, or Λιμήν in Greek) in the north, and runs along the north and west coast of the island to Limenaria in the south. The other coastal road that runs along the east and south coast is part of Kavala Provincial Road 17.

== History ==
Ministerial Decision G25871 of 9 July 1963 created the EO69 from the old EO50, which existed by royal decree from 1955 until 1963, and followed the same route as the current EO69.
