= Arkadiko Bridge =

Arkadiko Bridge (Kazarma Bridge) Arkadiko
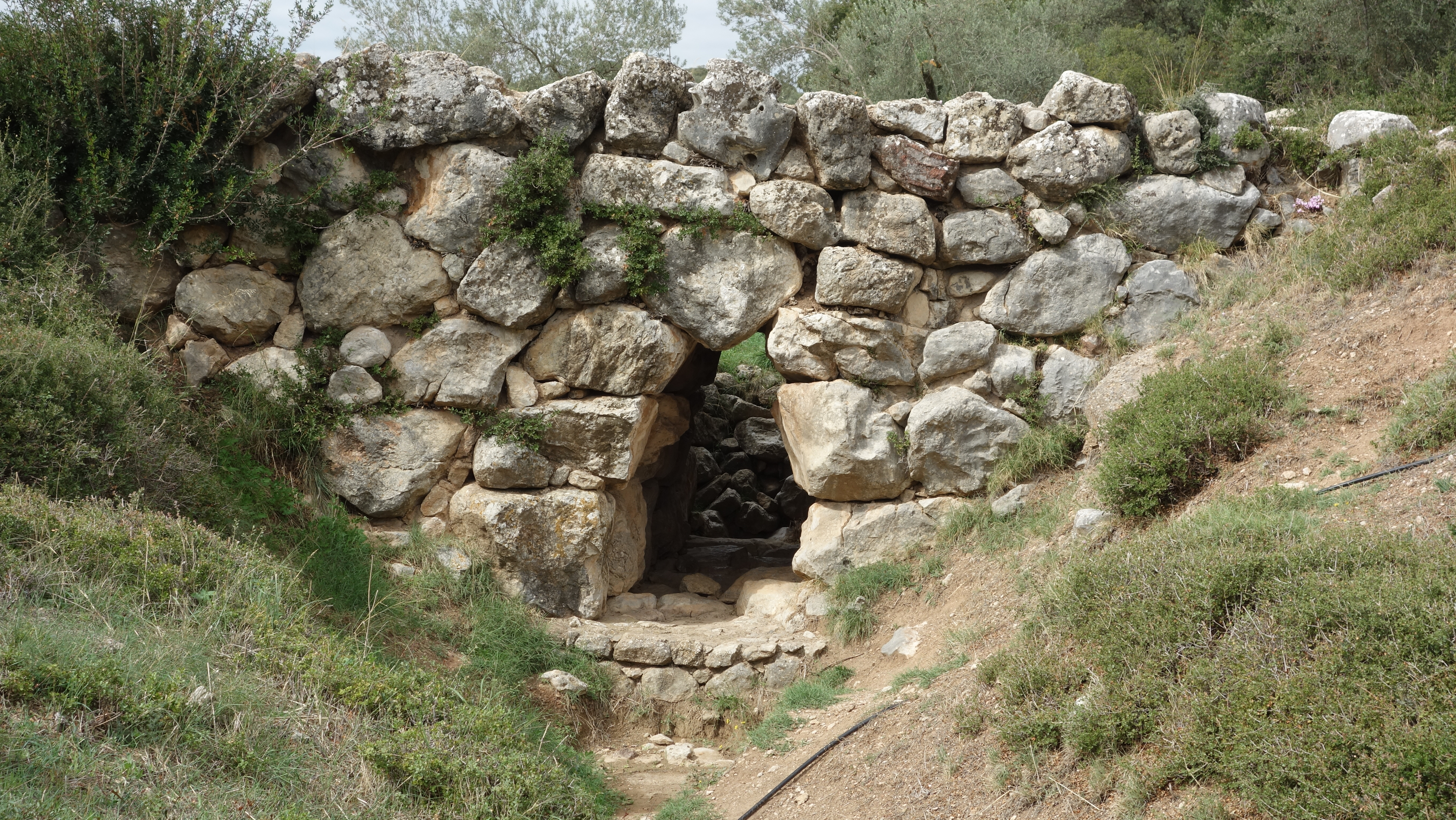
- Arkadiko or Kazarma Bridge
- Coordinates: 37°35′37″N 22°56′15″E
- Carries: Mycenaean road Tiryns–Epidauros
- Locale: Arkadiko, Argolis, Greece

Characteristics
- Design: Corbel arch bridge
- Material: Cyclopean stone
- Total length: 22 m
- Width: 2.50 m
- Height: 4 m
- Longest span: Ca. 1 m
- No. of spans: 1

History
- Opened: Ca. 1300-1190 BC (LHIII)

Location
- Interactive map of Arkadiko Bridge (Kazarma Bridge)

The Arkadiko Bridge or Kazarma Bridge is a Mycenaean bridge near the modern road from Tiryns to Epidauros in Argolis on the Peloponnese, Greece. The stone crossing, which is dated to the Greek Bronze Age, is one of the oldest crossable arch bridges still in existence. It is the oldest preserved bridge in Europe.

The corbel arch bridge was constructed during the Mycenaean Period in a typical Cyclopean style contemporary to the Late Helladic period (III) (ca. 1300–1190 BC). The bridge, which is 22 m (72 ft) long, 5.60 m (18.4 ft) wide at the base and 4 m (13 ft) high, spans a 1-metre (3 ft 3 in) culvert. The width of the roadway is about 2.50 metres (8 ft 2 in).

Arkadiko Bridge was part of a military highway between the two cities of Tiryns to Epidauros which formed part of a wider Hellenic road network. The sophisticated layout of the bridge and the alignment of the road indicate that the bridge could be used by chariots. Three thousand years later, the bridge remains in local use.

== Other Mycenaean bridges in Argolis ==
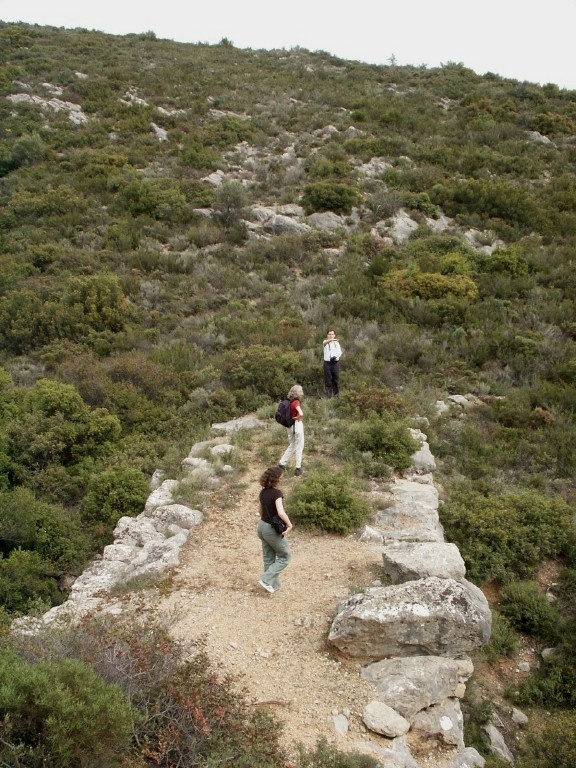
The Mycenaean Bridge II (Petrogephyri bridge) about 1 km (0.62 mi) west of Arkadiko Bridge.

The Arkadiko Bridge is one of four known Mycenaean corbel arch bridges near Arkadiko in Argolis. They are all of similar design and age and belong to the same Bronze Age highway between the two cities of Tiryns to Epidauros. One of them is the Petrogephyri bridge, which crosses the same stream 1 km (0.62 mi) to the west of the Arkadiko bridge. The structure, which is otherwise similar in size and appearance, has a larger span and a slightly higher vault. It remains in use as part of a locally used track.

A fifth, well-preserved Mycenaean bridge is located in the wider region at Lykotroupi in northern Argolis, where it was part of another Mycenaean main road. Its measurements are close to the Arkadiko Bridge: 5.20 m (17.1 ft) wide at the bottom, 2.40 m (7 ft 10 in) at the top, and with a corbelled arch span of a little more than a metre. The road still features stone curbs which would have kept the wheels of fast-moving chariots away from the bridge's edge.
