= Asklipieio =

Asklipieio Ασκληπιείο
- Municipal unit
- Location within the regional unit

- Location within Greece
- Coordinates: 37°36′N 23°02′E
- Country: Greece
- Administrative region: Peloponnese
- Regional unit: Argolis
- Municipality: Epidaurus

Area
  - Municipal unit: 179.8 km^{2} (69.4 sq mi)

Population (2021)
  - Municipal unit: 3,612
  - Municipal unit density: 20.09/km^{2} (52.03/sq mi)
  - Community: 2,500
- Time zone: UTC+2 (EET)
  - Summer (DST): UTC+3 (EEST)
- Postal code: 210 52
- Vehicle registration: AP

Asklipieio (Greek: Ασκληπιείο) is a former municipality in Argolis, Peloponnese, Greece. Since the 2011 local government reform it is part of the municipality Epidaurus, of which it is a municipal unit. The municipal unit has an area of 179.838 km^{2}. Population 3,612 (2011). The seat of the municipality was in Lygourio.

The sanctuary of Asklepios at Epidaurus is situated on the territory of the municipal unit, hence its name.
