= Lygourio =

Lygourio Λυγουριό
- Settlement
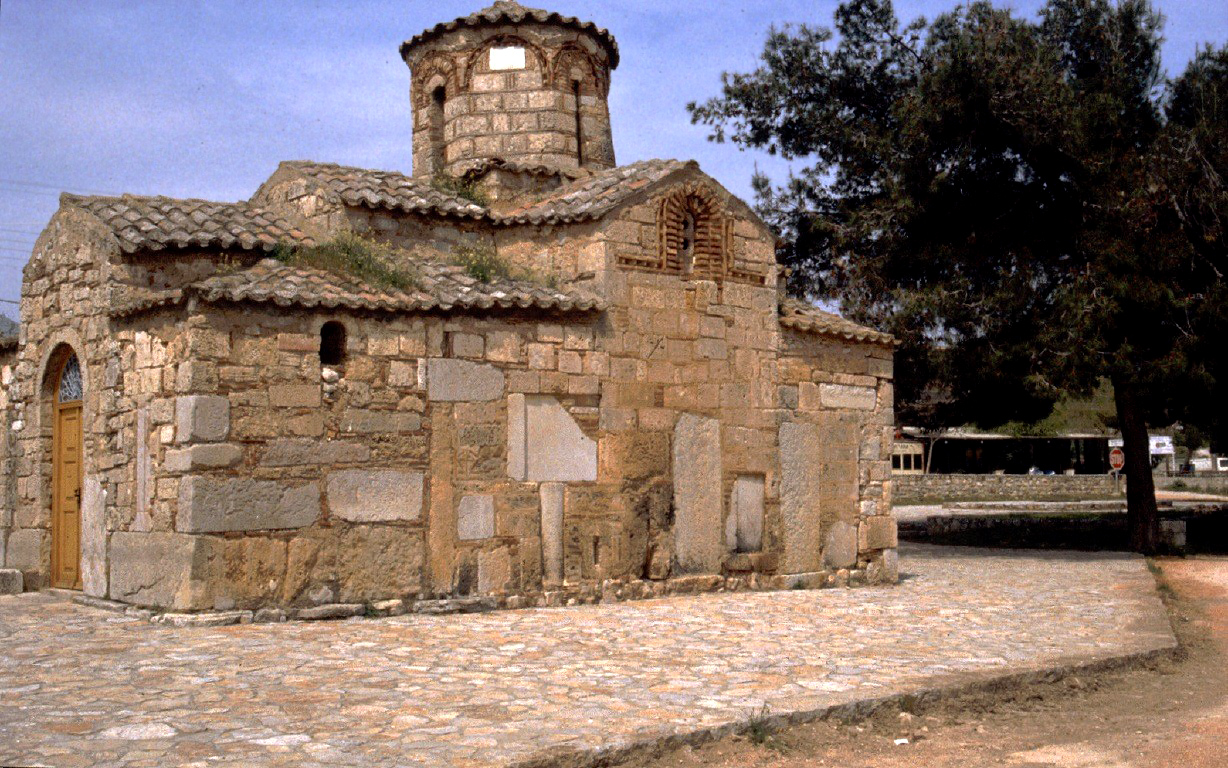
- The temple of Agios Ioannis Eleimon in Lygourio

- Location within Greece
- Coordinates: 37°36′N 23°02′E
- Country: Greece
- Administrative region: Peloponnese
- Regional unit: Argolis
- Municipality: Epidaurus
- Municipal unit: Asklipieio

Population (2021)
  - Community: 2,500
- Time zone: UTC+2 (EET)
  - Summer (DST): UTC+3 (EEST)
- Vehicle registration: AP

Lygourio is a Greek small town located about the middle of Argolis prefecture. It is built at the foot of Arachnaion Mountain at a height of 370 meters, near the Ancient Theatre of Epidaurus. Its population is 2482 inhabitants according to 2011 census. Lygourio is the seat of Epidavros municipality and Asklipieio municipal unit.

== History ==
The origin of the name Lygourio is unknown and there are only conjectures. According to an opinion, the name Lygourio derives from the corruption of the word Elaiogyrion that means olive factory. In antiquity, in this place there was the ancient city Lessa which was referred by Pausanias. During 4th century B.C. near Lessa was located the sanctuary Asclepieium of Epidaurus. The area was devoted to the deities from prehistoric period but the most important buildings of the sanctuary were built during 4th century B.C. Then the sanctuary was devoted to Asclepius the god of medicine. One of the most famous building is the ancient theatre that is located two Km away from Lygourio. The sanctuary was abandoned after the destructive earthquakes of 522 and 551 A.D. The name Lygourio is mentioned for first time during 14th century and again during 15th century in Venetian document. The village is believed to have changed its place during early 18th century. For this reason, documents of this period mention to another village with name Paleo Ligourio (old Lygourio). Nowadays, Lygourio is the seat of Epidavros municipality. Its economy based in agriculture and tourism. Every summer during Athens-Epidaurus Festival, a lot of tourist visit Lygourio to attend a theatre performance.

=== Historical population ===
| Census | Lygourio Settlement | Asklipeio Community |
|---|---|---|
| 1991 | 2,182 | |
| 2001 | 2,678 | 3,131 |
| 2011 | 2,482 | 2,849 |
| 2021 | 2,197 | 2,500 |

== Places of interest ==
- Asclepieium of Epidaurus, ancient sanctuary devoted to Asclepius that includes the famous ancient Theatre of Epidaurus.
- Arkadiko Bridge, ancient bridge of Mycenean period, few Km away from Lygourio.
- Lygourio pyramid, ruins of an ancient pyramid near the village.
- Temple of Agios Ioannis Eleimon, Byzantine temple, near the village.
- Natural History Museum, Lygourio, an important natural history museum in Greece.
