= Nea Epidavros =

Village in Argolis, Greece

Nea Epidavros Νέα Επίδαυρος
- Community
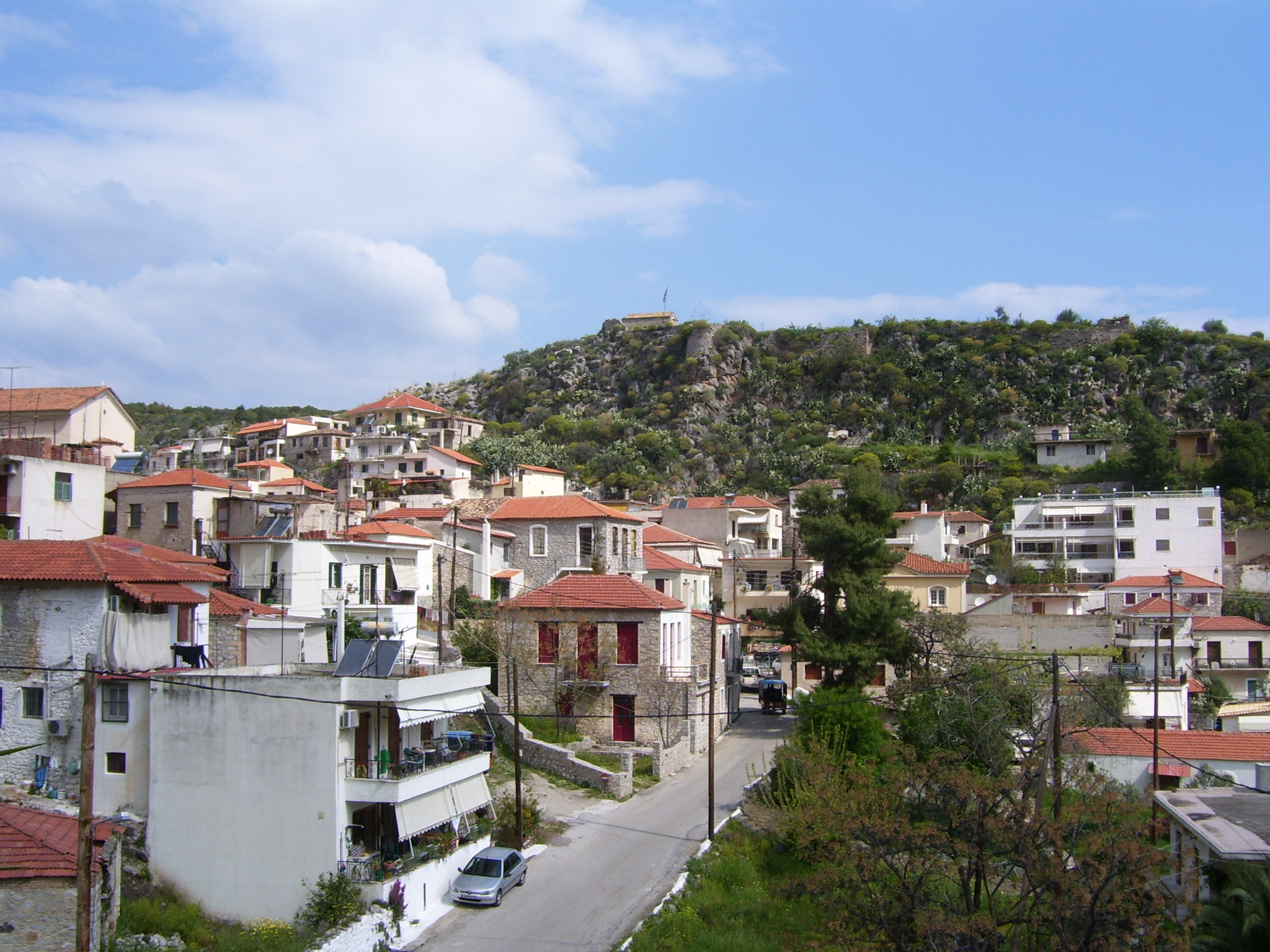
- View of Nea Epidavros and its castle

- Location within Greece
- Coordinates: 37°40′N 23°09′E
- Country: Greece
- Administrative region: Peloponnese
- Regional unit: Argolis

Population (2021)
  - Community: 871
- Time zone: UTC+2 (EET)
  - Summer (DST): UTC+3 (EEST)
- Vehicle registration: AP

Nea Epidavros, (Greek: Νέα Επίδαυρος, pronounced [ˌnea eˈpiðavros]) also known by its latinized name Nea Epidaurus, is a village in Argolis regional unit, Greece. It is located in the east of Argolis peninsula, 40 km east of Nafplio. Epidavros is mainly known for First National Assembly that took place in Nea Epidavros in late 1821 and early 1822. The village is part of Epidaurus municipality.

== Description ==
The settlement is built in the interior part of a steep rock only few kilometres from the sea. This town is not visible from the sea, so the inhabitants were protected from Pirates in the old days. At the top of the rock is a medieval castle that dates back to the Byzantine period. The years before the Greek War of Independence, the village was named Piada. Between 20 December 1821 and 16 January 1822, the First National Assembly of the Greeks took place at Nea Epidavros (those days Piada). It was a national gathering of political representative of Greek revolutionaries. Today there is a monument in the central square of the village, dedicated to the first national assembly.

An interesting place to see in Nea Epidavros is the medieval castle. Inside the castle is the maintained church of Agios Ioannis Theologos built in 11th century. Near the village is the monastery of Agnountos. It dates from the Byzantine era and its style is fortress-like.

== Historical population ==
Census	Settlement	Community
1991	1,116	-
2001	1,127	1,231
2011	896	987
2021	814	871

== Pictures ==
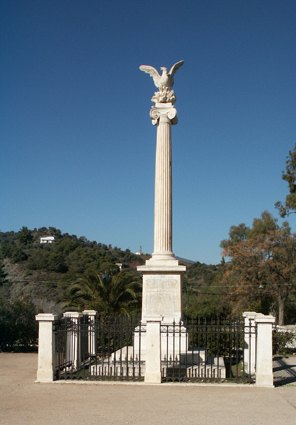
The Monument of the First Assembly

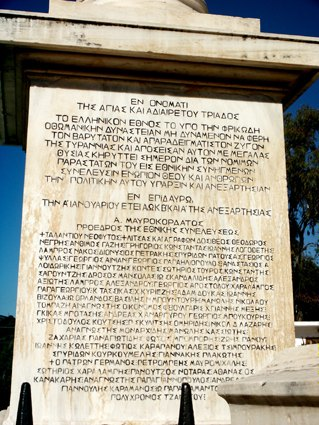
Bottom part of the monument, containing the beginning of the Greek Constitution of 1822, declaring the independence of the Greek nation from the Ottoman Empire.
