= Nea Tiryntha =

Nea Tiryntha Νέα Τίρυνθα
- Municipal unit
- Location within the regional unit

- Location within Greece
- Coordinates: 37°36′N 22°49′E
- Country: Greece
- Administrative region: Peloponnese
- Regional unit: Argolis
- Municipality: Nafplio

Area
  - Municipal unit: 41.44 km^{2} (16.00 sq mi)

Population (2021)
  - Municipal unit: 3,207
  - Municipal unit density: 77.39/km^{2} (200.4/sq mi)
  - Community: 1,497
- Time zone: UTC+2 (EET)
  - Summer (DST): UTC+3 (EEST)
- Vehicle registration: AP

Nea Tiryntha (Greek: Νέα Τίρυνθα) is a village and a former municipality in Argolis, Peloponnese, Greece. Since the 2011 local government reform it is part of the municipality Nafplio, of which it is a municipal unit. The municipal unit has an area of 41.443 km^{2}. Population 3,207 (2021).
