= Ancient Theatre of Epidaurus =

Theater in Epidaurus, Greece

Theatre of Epidaurus
- Θέατρο της Επιδαύρου (Greek)
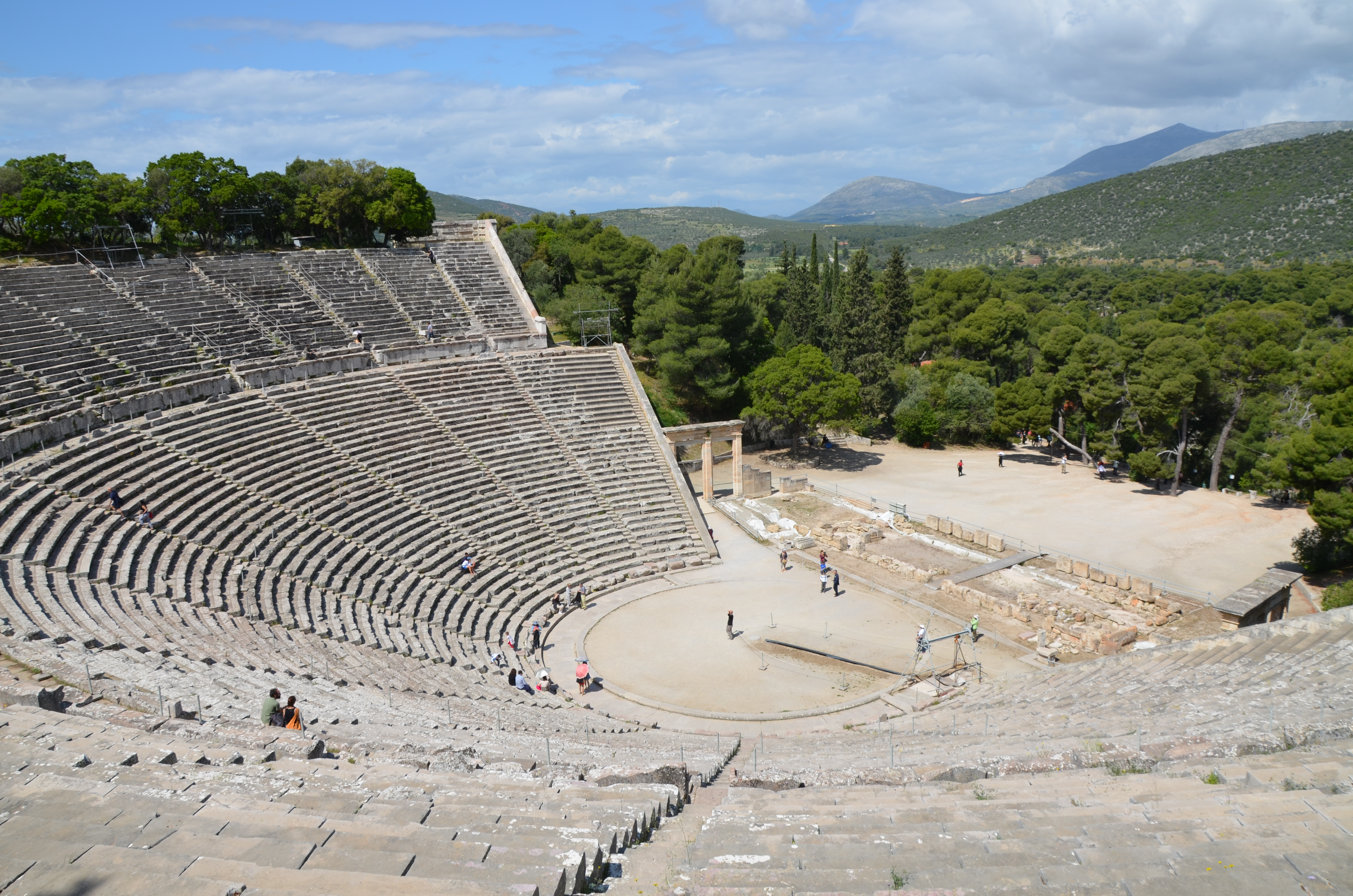

- Location within Greece
- 37°35′46″N 23°04′45″E
- Type: theater
- Cultures: Greek, Roman
- Location: Greece, Epidaurus
- Region: Argolis
- Part of: Ancient Greek theaters

History
- Built: 4th century BCE

Site notes
- Excavation dates: since 1879
- Archaeologists: Panagiotis Kavvadias
- Condition: partly restored ruins
- Management: Archaeological Society of Athens
- Public access: Archaeological park

UNESCO World Heritage Site
- Official name: Sanctuary of Asklepios at Epidaurus
- Criteria: Cultural: i, ii, iii, iv, vi
- Reference: 491
- Inscription: 1988 (12th Session)
- Area: 1,393.8 ha (3,444 acres)
- Buffer zone: 3,386.4 ha (8,368 acres)

The Ancient Theatre of Epidaurus is a theatre in the Greek city of Epidaurus, located on the southeast end of the sanctuary dedicated to the ancient Greek God of medicine, Asclepius. It is built on the west side of Cynortion Mountain, near modern Lygourio, and belongs to the Epidaurus Municipality. Constructed in the late 4th century BC, it is considered to be the most perfect ancient Greek theatre with regard to acoustics and aesthetics. Because of its exceptional architecture and aesthetics, the theatre was inscribed on the UNESCO World Heritage List in 1988 along with the Temple of Asclepius.

== History ==
According to Pausanias, the ancient theatre was constructed at the end of the 4th century BC, circa 340-300 BCE, by the architect Polykleitos the Younger. Pausanias praises the theatre for its symmetry and beauty. At a maximum capacity of 13,000 to 14,000 spectators, the theatre hosted music, singing and dramatic games that were included in the worship of Asclepius. It was also used as a means to heal patients, since there was a belief that the observation of dramatic shows had positive effects on mental and physical health.

Today, the monument attracts a large number of Greek and foreign visitors and is used for the performance of ancient drama plays. The first modern performance conducted at the theatre was Sophocles's tragedy Electra. It was played in 1938, directed by Dimitris Rontiris, starring Katina Paxinou and Eleni Papadaki.

Performances stopped due to World War II. Theatrical performances, in the framework of the organized festival, began again in 1954. In 1955 they were established as an annual event for the presentation of ancient drama. The Epidaurus Festival continues today and is carried out during the summer months.

The theatre has been sporadically used to host major musical events. In the framework of the Epidaurus Festival, well-known Greek and foreign actors have appeared, including the Greek soprano Maria Callas, who performed Norma in 1960 and Médée in 1961.

== Description ==
The monument retains the characteristic tripartite structure of a Hellenistic theatre that has a theatron, orchestra, and skene. During Roman times, the theatre (unlike many Greek theatres) did not suffer any modifications.

The auditorium is divided vertically into two unequal parts, the lower hollow or theatre and the upper theatre or epitheatre. The two sub-sections are separated by a horizontal corridor for the movement of spectators (width 1.82 m.), the frieze. The lower part of the auditorium wedge is divided into 12 sections, while the upper part is divided into 22 sections. The lower rows of the upper and lower auditoriums have a presidency form, namely places reserved for important people. The design of the auditorium is unique and based on three marking centres. Due to this special design, the architects achieved both optimal acoustics and an opening for better viewing.

The circular orchestra, with a diameter of 20 m, constitutes the centre of the theatre. In the centre is a circular stone plate, the base of the altar or thymele. The orchestra is surrounded by a special underground drainage pipeline of 1.99 m width, called the euripos. The euripos was covered by a circular stone walkway.

Opposite the auditorium and behind the orchestra develops the stage building of the theatre (skene), which was constructed in two phases: the first is placed at the end of the 4th century BCE and the second in the middle of the 2nd century BCE. The format of the skene (which is partly preserved today) is dated up to the Hellenistic period and consisted of a two-storey stage building and a proscenium in front of the stage. There was a colonnade in front of the proscenium and on both of its sides, the two backstages slightly protruded. East and west of the two backstages there were two small rectangular rooms for the needs of the performers. Two ramps lead to the roof of the proscenium, the logeion, where the actors later played. Finally, the theatre had two gates, which are now restored.

== Excavations ==
The first systematic excavation of the theatre began in 1881 by the Archaeological Society, under the direction of archaeologist Panayis Kavvadias and preserved it in very good condition thanks to the restorations of P. Kavvadias (1907), of A. Orlandos (1954–1963) and the Preservation Committee for Epidaurus Monuments (1988 to 2016). With the work done, the theatre has been recovered – except the stage building – almost entirely in its original form.

== See also ==
- List of ancient Greek theatres
- List of works designed with the golden ratio
- Theatre at Halicarnassus
