= Epidaurus =

Epidaurus Ἐπίδαυρος
- Municipality
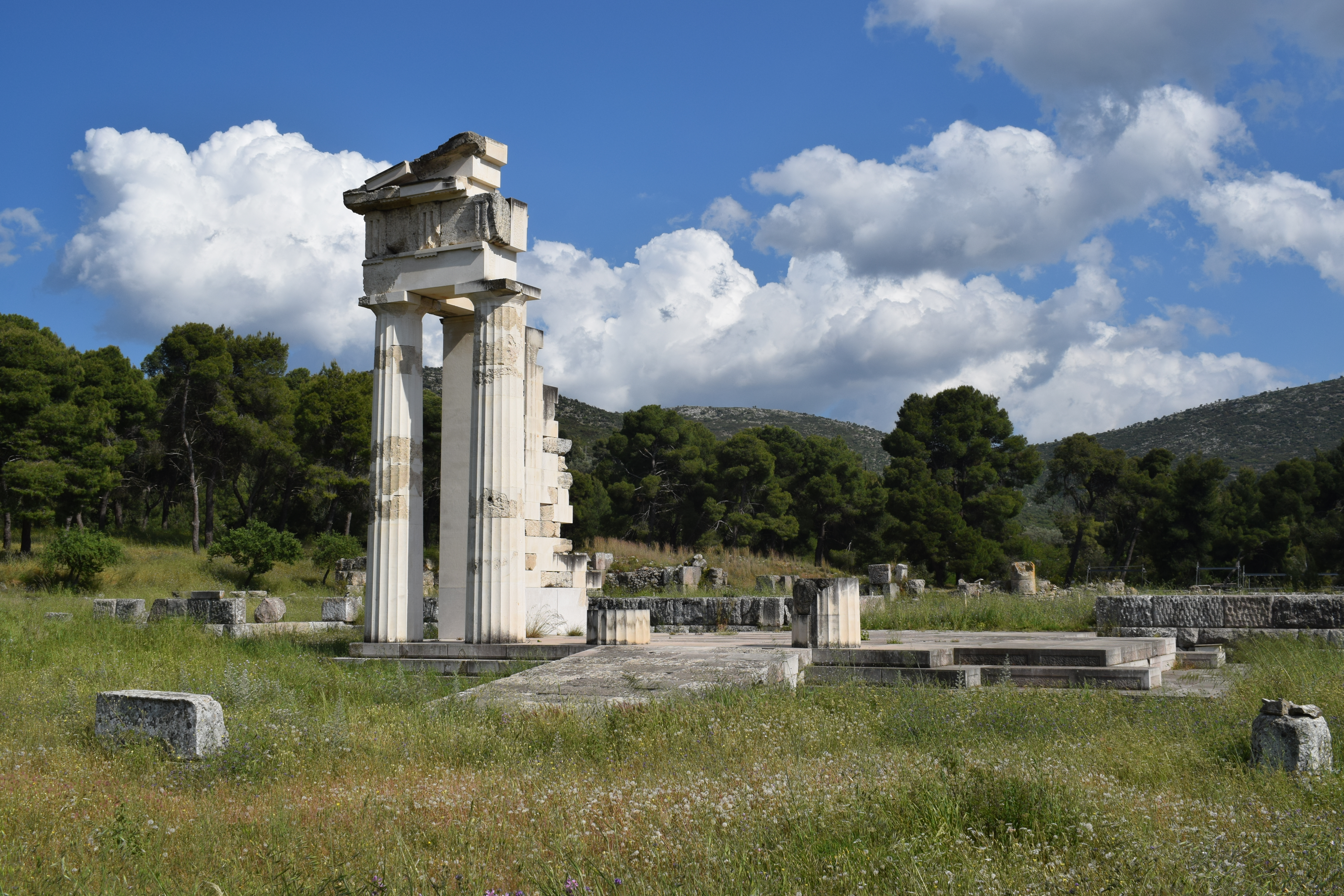

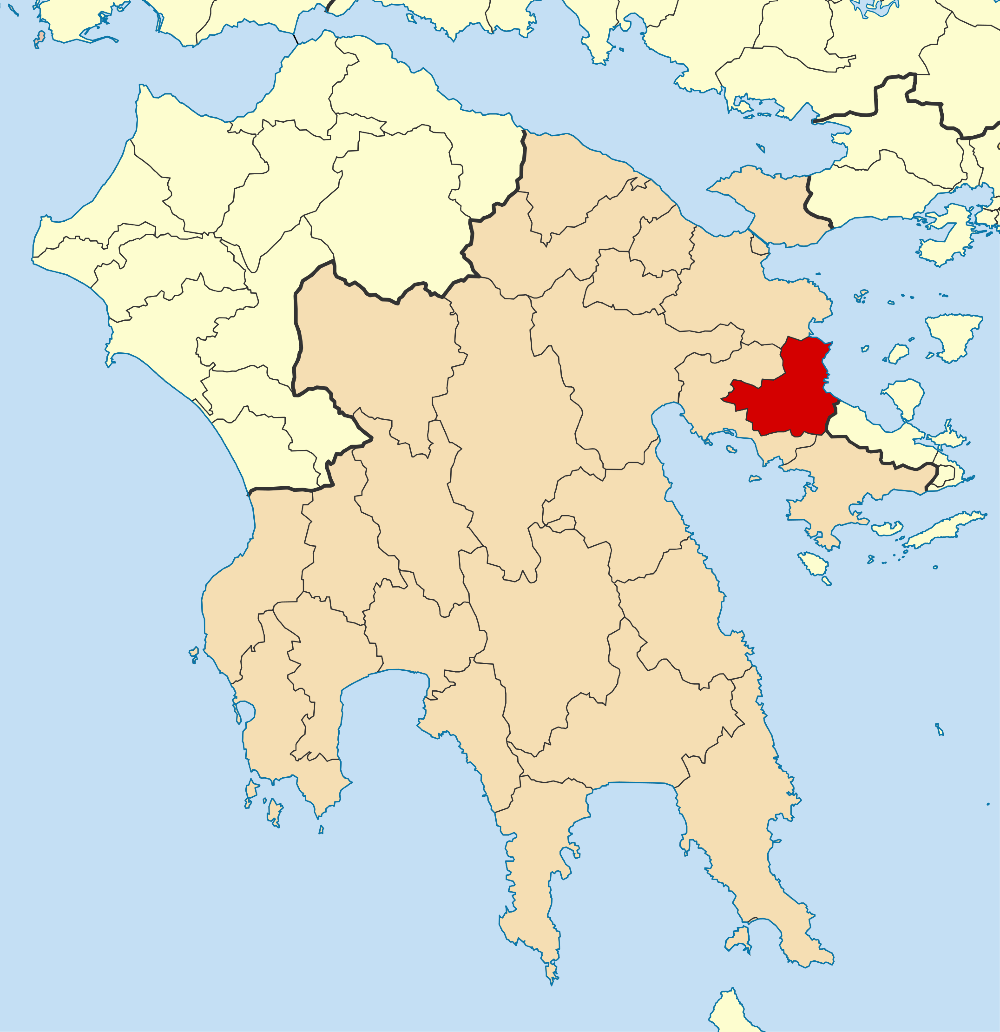

- Location within Greece
- Coordinates: 37°35′52″N 23°04′28″E
- Country: Greece
- Administrative region: Peloponnese
- Regional unit: Argolis
- Seat: Lygourio

UNESCO World Heritage Site
- Official name: Sanctuary of Asklepios at Epidaurus
- Criteria: Cultural: i, ii, iii, iv, vi
- Reference: 491
- Inscription: 1988 (12th Session)
- Area: 1,393.8 ha (3,444 acres)
- Buffer zone: 3,386.4 ha (8,368 acres)

Area
  - Municipality: 340.4 km^{2} (131.4 sq mi)
  - Municipal unit: 160.6 km^{2} (62.0 sq mi)

Population (2021)
  - Municipality: 7,030
  - Density: 20.7/km^{2} (53.5/sq mi)
  - Municipal unit: 3,418
  - Municipal unit density: 21.28/km^{2} (55.12/sq mi)
- Time zone: UTC+2 (EET)
  - Summer (DST): UTC+3 (EEST)
- Postal code: 210 59
- Vehicle registration: AP

Epidaurus (Greek: Ἐπίδαυρος) was a small city (polis) in ancient Greece, on the Argolid Peninsula at the Saronic Gulf. Two modern towns bear the name Epidavros: Palaia Epidavros and Nea Epidavros. Since 2010 they belong to the new municipality of Epidaurus, part of the regional unit of Argolis. The chair of the municipality is the town Lygourio. The nearby sanctuary of Asclepius and ancient theatre were inscribed on the UNESCO World Heritage List in 1988 because of their exemplary architecture and importance in the development and spread of healing sanctuaries and cults across the ancient Greek and Roman worlds.

== Name and etymology ==
The name "Epidaurus" is of Greek origin. It was named after the hero Epidauros, son of Apollo. According to Strabo, the city was originally named Ἐπίκαρος (Epíkaros) under the Carians, (Aristotle claimed that Caria, as a naval empire, occupied Epidaurus and Hermione) before taking the name Ἐπίταυρος (Epítauros) when the city was taken by the Ionians and finally becoming Ἐπίδαυρος (Epídauros) after the Dorians conquered the city. Compare the individual elements ἐπί (epí, "upon"), Καρία (Karía, "Carian"), ταῦρος (taûros, "bull") and Δωριεύς (Dōrieús "Dorian")/Δωριεῖς (Dōrieîs, "Dorians").

== History ==
Epidaurus was independent of Argos and not included in Argolis until the time of the Romans. With its supporting territory, it formed the small territory called Epidauria. It was reputed to be founded by or named for the hero Epidaurus, and to be the birthplace of Apollo's son Asclepius the healer.

== Buildings ==
=== Sanctuary of Asclepius ===
Epidaurus is best known for its healing sanctuary (asclepieion) and the Sanctuary of Asclepius, situated about five miles (8 km) from the town, with its theatre, which is still in use today. The cult of Asclepius at Epidaurus is attested in the 6th century BC, when the older hill-top sanctuary of Apollo Maleatas was no longer spacious enough. It was the most celebrated healing centre of the Classical world, the place where ill people went in the hope of being cured. To find out the right cure for their ailments, they spent a night in the enkoimeteria, a big sleeping hall. In their dreams, the god himself would advise them what they had to do to regain their health. Within the sanctuary there was a guest house (katagogion) with 160 guest rooms. There are also mineral springs in the vicinity, which may have been used in healing.

Asclepius, the most important healer god of antiquity, brought prosperity to the sanctuary, which flourished until the first half of the first century BC, when it suffered extensive damage when it was sacked by Sulla during the First Mithridatic War. It was revived after a visit by Hadrian in AD 124 and enjoyed renewed prosperity in the following centuries.

In AD 395 the Goths raided the sanctuary. Even after the introduction of Christianity and the silencing of the oracles, the sanctuary at Epidaurus was still known as late as the mid 5th century as a Christian healing centre.

=== Theatre ===
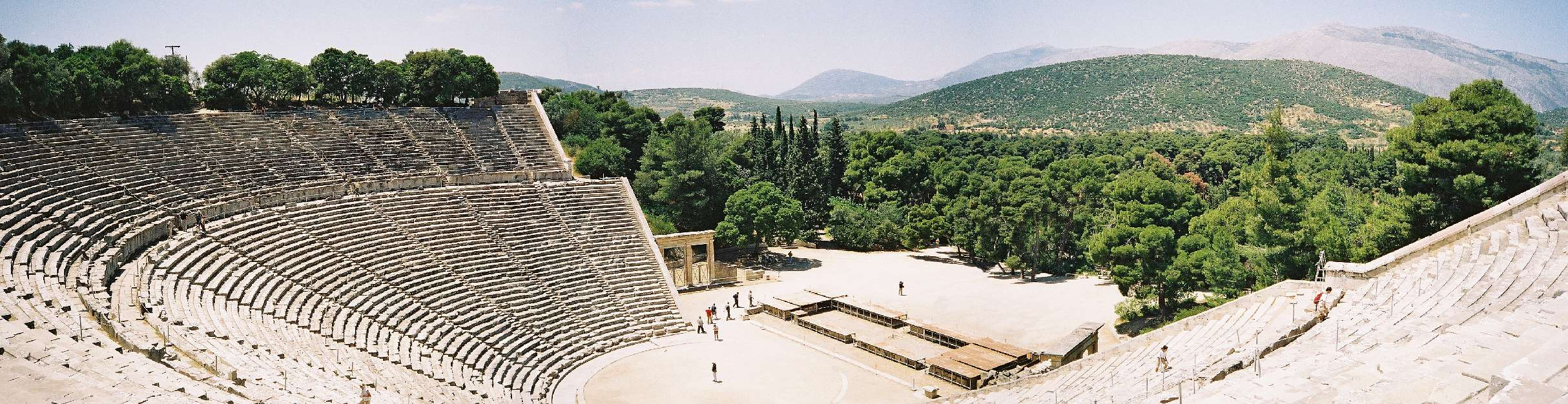
The Ancient Theatre of Epidaurus

The prosperity brought by the asclepeion enabled Epidaurus to construct civic monuments, including the huge theatre that delighted Pausanias for its symmetry and beauty, used again today for dramatic performances, the ceremonial hestiatoreion (banqueting hall), and a palaestra. The ancient theatre of Epidaurus was designed by Polykleitos the Younger in the 4th century BC. The original 34 rows were extended in Roman times by another 21 rows. As is usual for Greek theatres (and as opposed to Roman ones), the view on a lush landscape behind the skênê is an integral part of the theatre itself and is not to be obscured. It seats up to 14,000 people.

The theatre has long had a reputation for its exceptional acoustics, which reportedly allowed almost perfect intelligibility of unamplified spoken words from the proscenium or skēnē to all 14,000 spectators, regardless of their seating, a tale often recounted by tour guides. In-situ measurements, however, somewhat moderate these claims: although most sounds can indeed be noticed throughout, intelligibility is not guaranteed, particularly for voice, which requires good projection, which might not have been a problem for Greek actors, who were reputed experts in this aspect. The acoustic properties are caused both by the physical shape, but also the construction material: the rows of limestone seats filter out low-frequency sounds, such as the murmur of the crowd, and also amplify the high-frequency sounds of the stage.

=== Other buildings ===
The town of Epidaurus had its own theatre which has been excavated since 1990 and found to be well-preserved. Dating from the 4th c. BC it had about 2000 seats. It has been renovated and is open to the public, as part of a scheme to conserve and enhance ancient theatres which has mapped 140 ancient arenas across Greece.

== Municipality ==
The municipality Epidavros was formed at the 2011 local government reform by the merger of the following two former municipalities, that became municipal units:

- Asklipieio
- Epidavros

The municipality has an area of 340.442 km^{2}, the municipal unit 160.604 km^{2}.

== Gallery ==
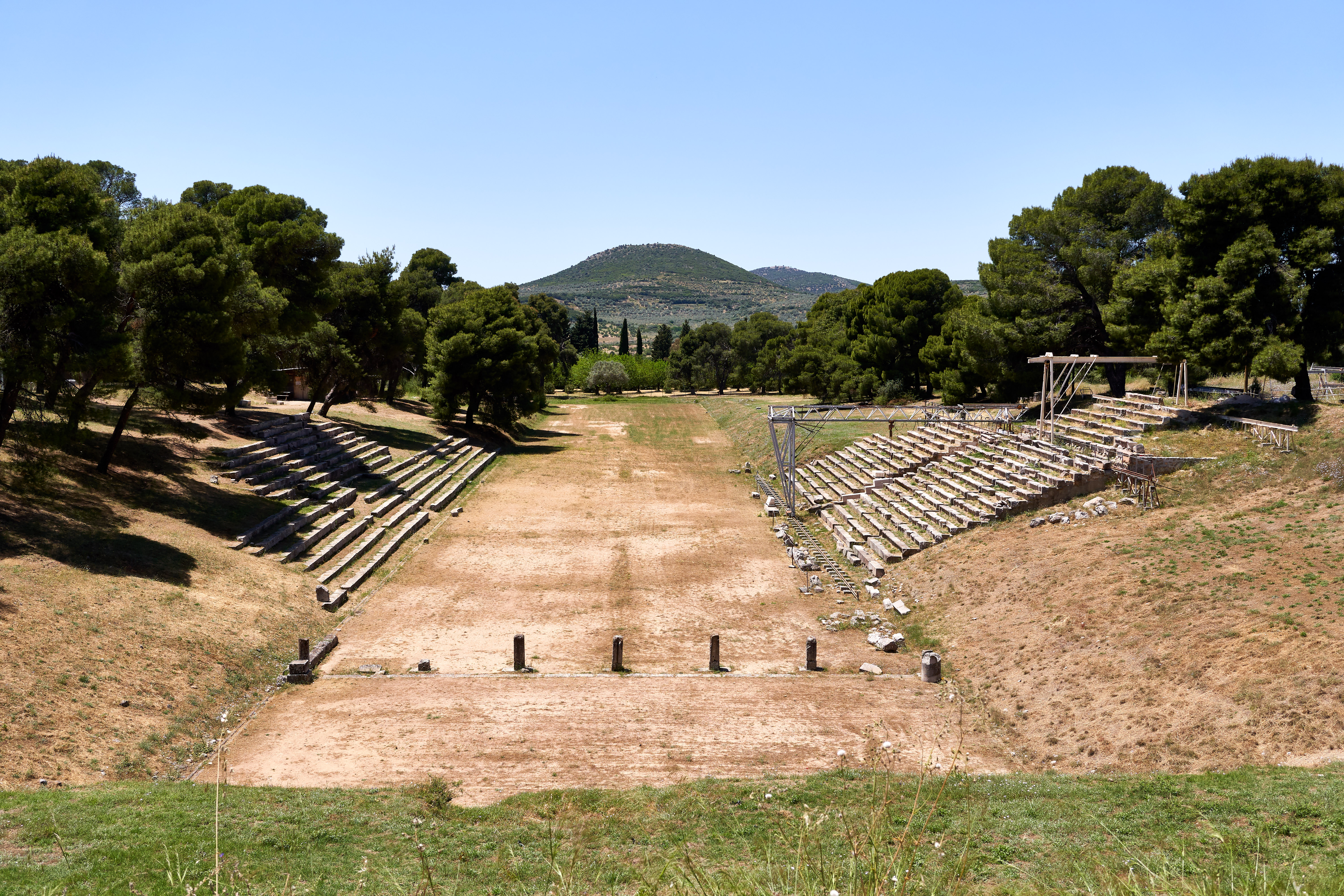
Stadion

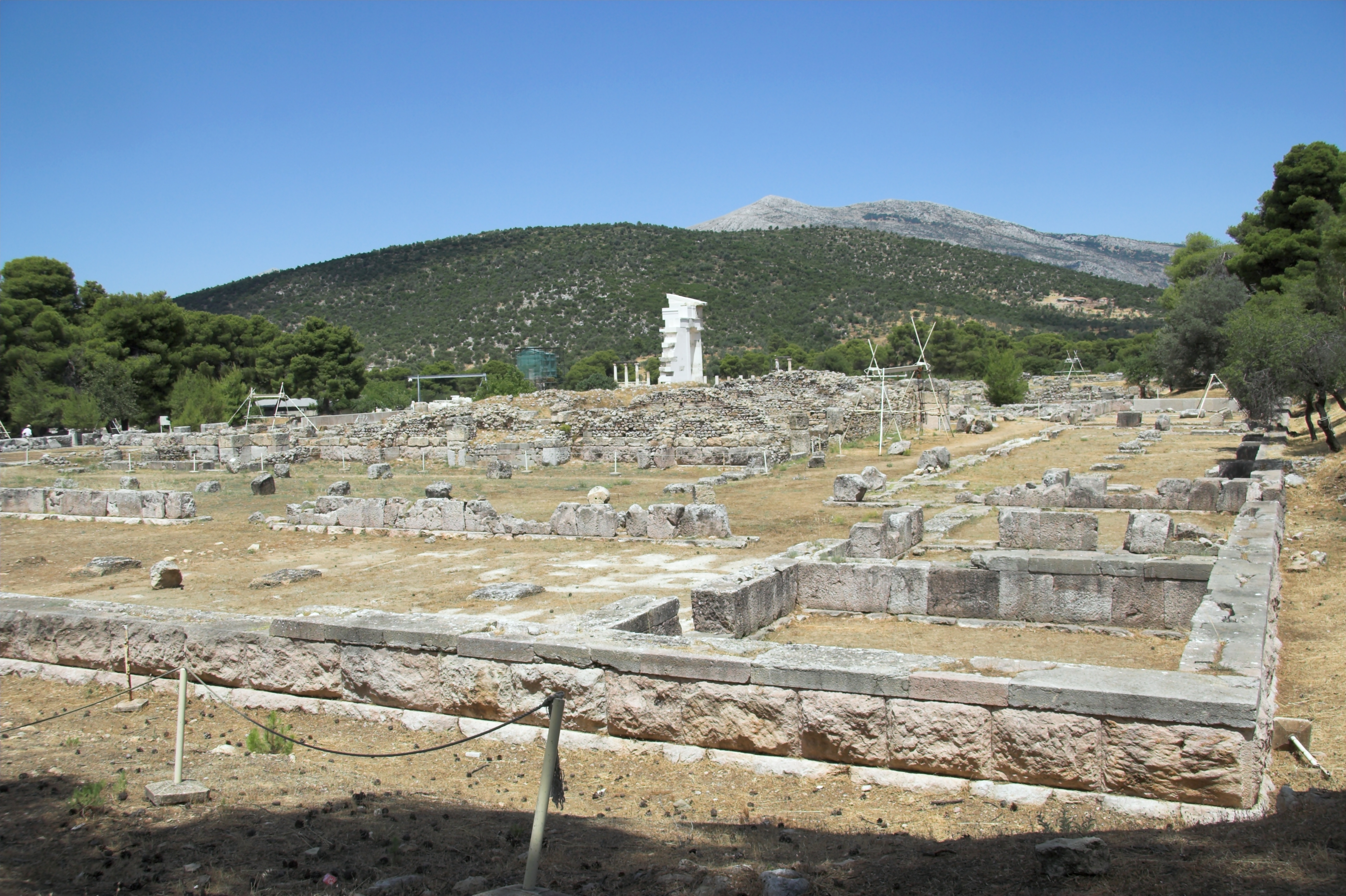
Gymnasion

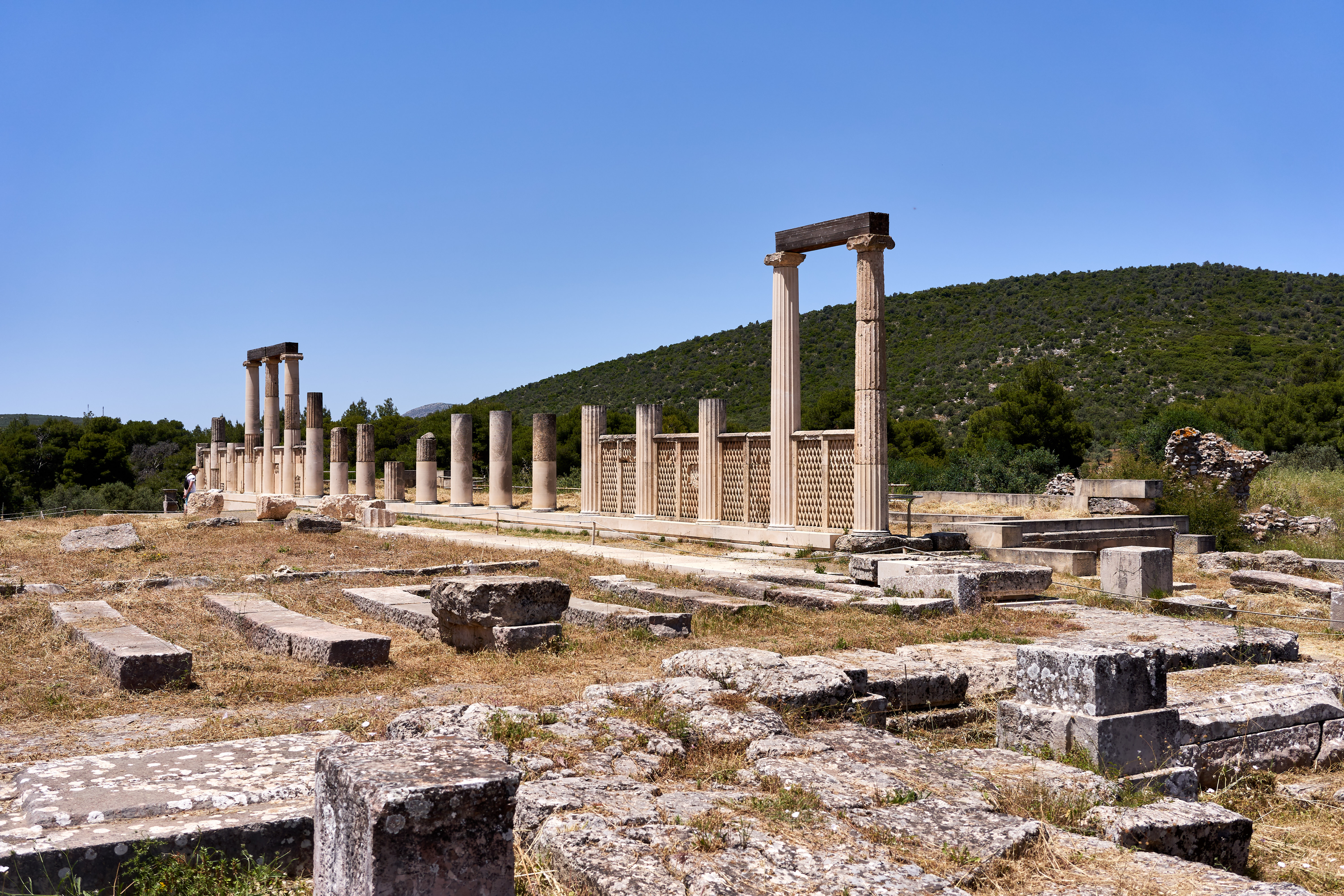
Abaton

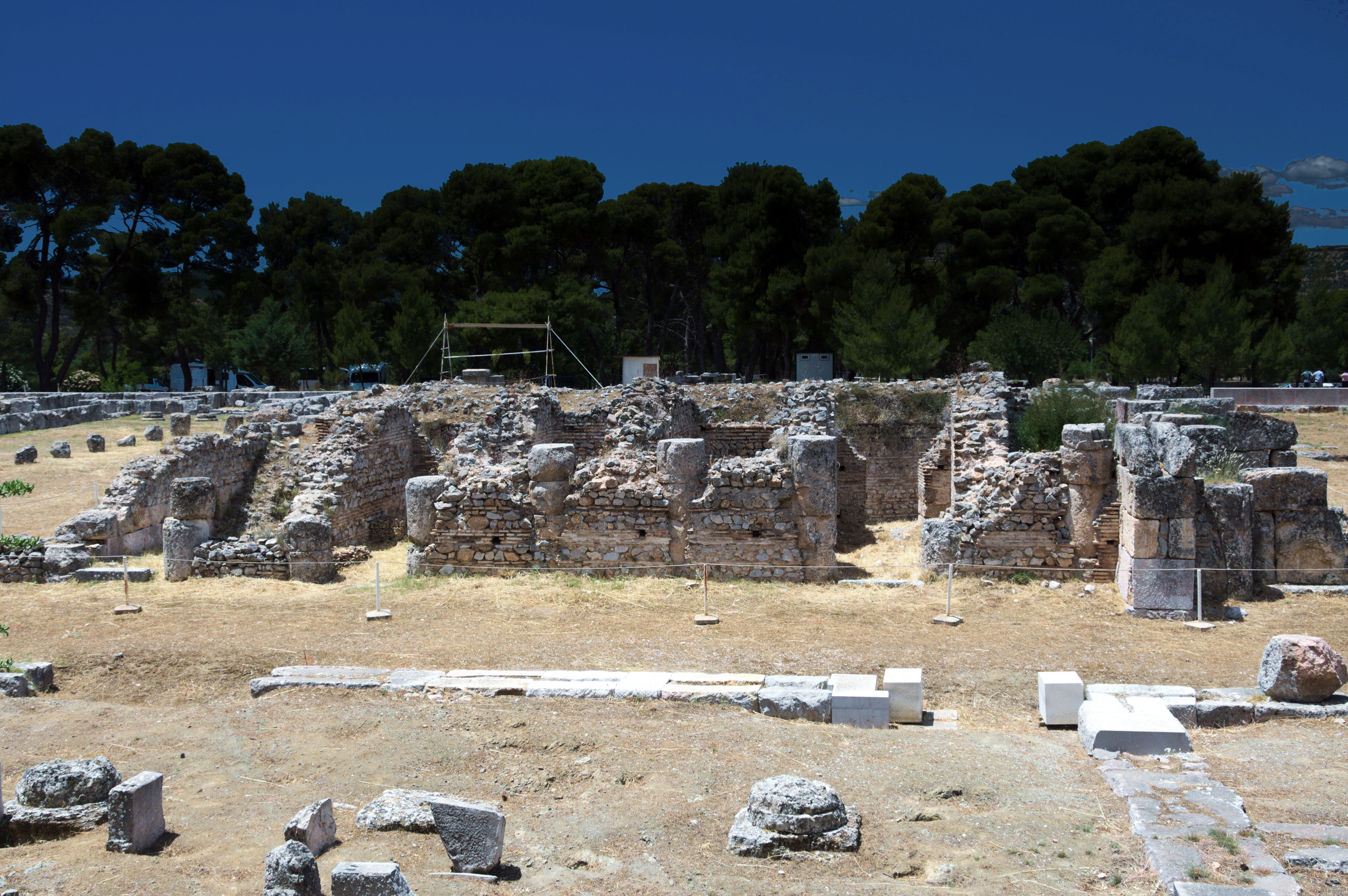
Odeon

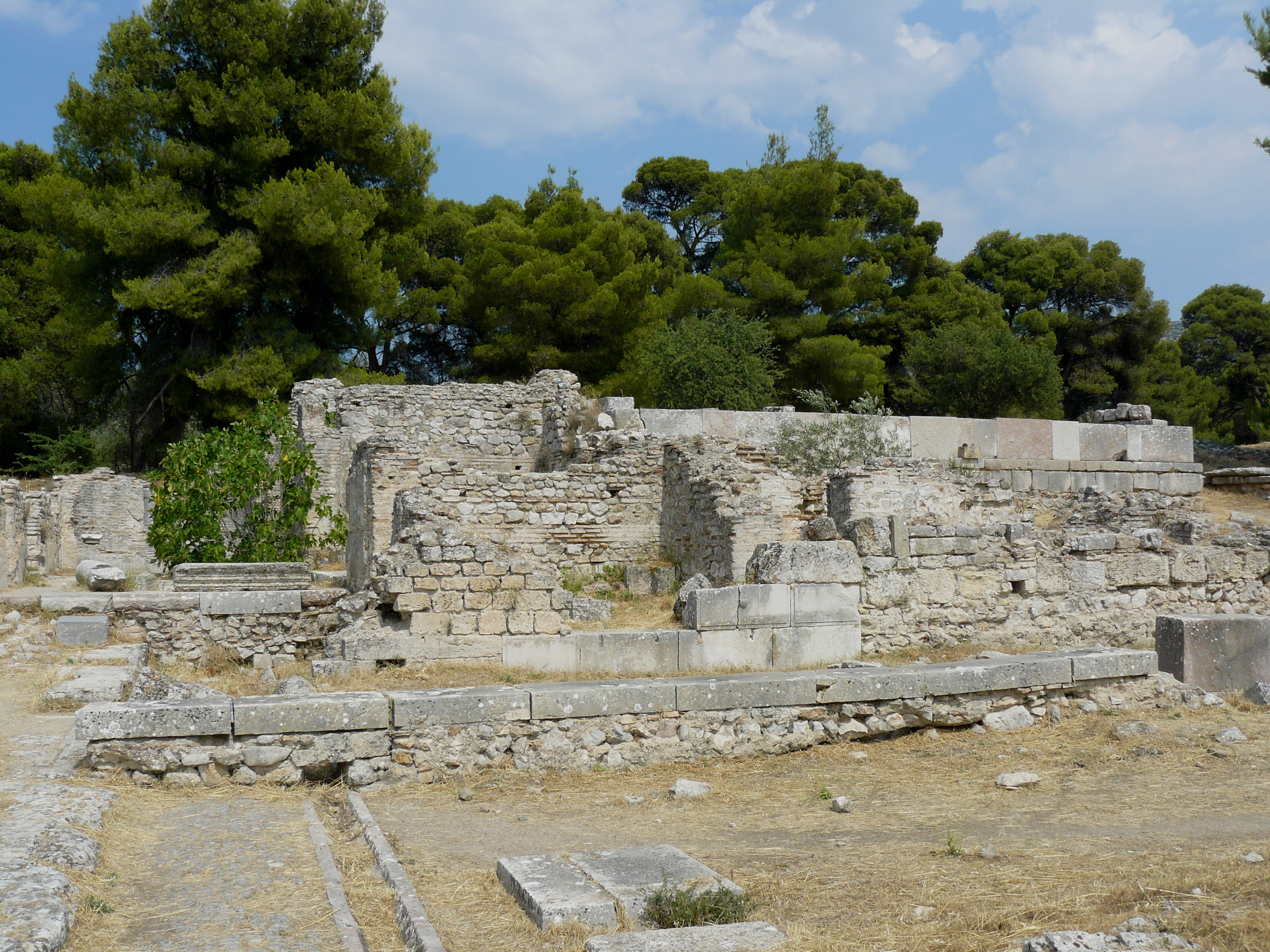
Roman baths

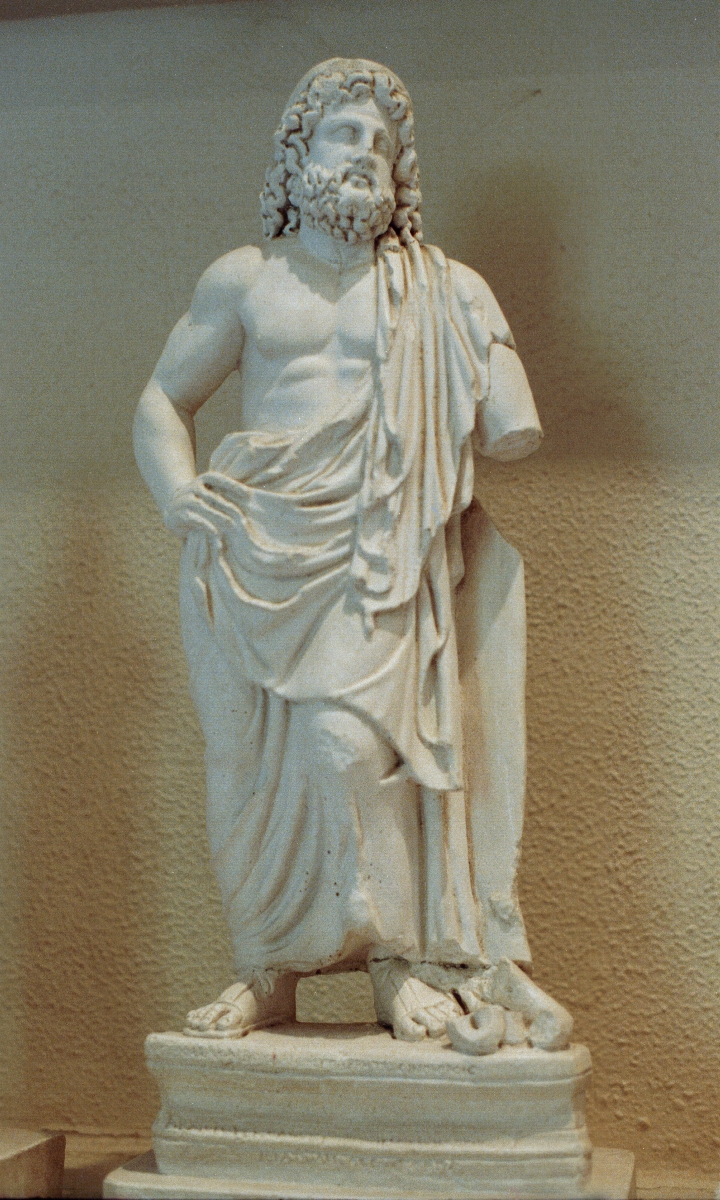
Statuette of Asclepius

== See also ==
- List of ancient Greek cities
- Callon of Epidaurus
