= Argolis =

Argolis Περιφερειακή ενότητα Αργολίδας
- Regional unit
- Municipalities of Argolis

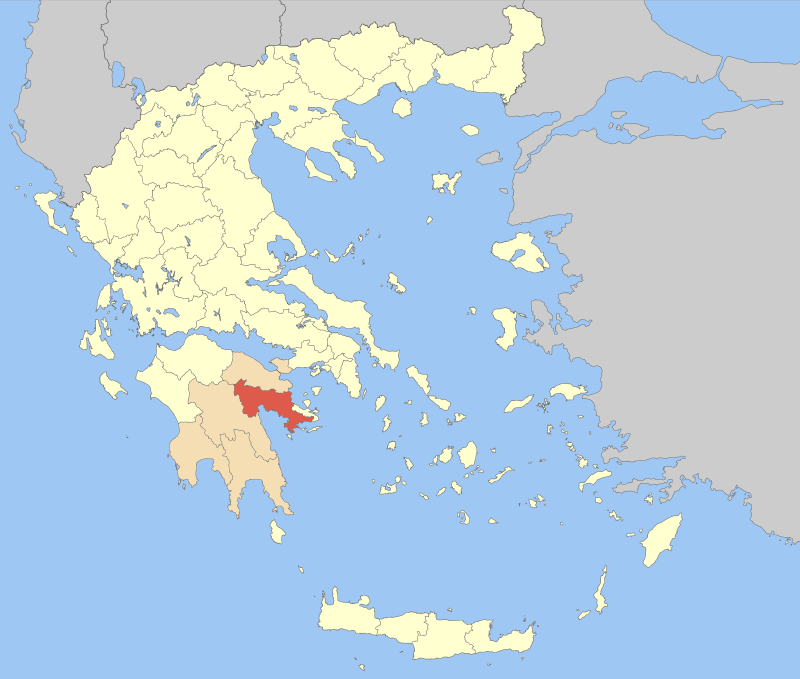
- Argolis within Greece

- Location within Greece
- Coordinates: 37°40′N 22°50′E
- Country: Greece
- Administrative region: Peloponnese
- Seat: Nafplio

Area
  - Total: 2,154 km^{2} (832 sq mi)

Population (2021)
  - Total: 93,216
  - Density: 43.28/km^{2} (112.1/sq mi)
- Time zone: UTC+2 (EET)
  - Summer (DST): UTC+3 (EEST)
- Postal code: 21x xx
- Area code: 275x0
- Vehicle registration: ΑΡ
- Website: www.argolida.gr

Argolis or Argolida (Greek: Αργολίδα Argolída [arɣoˈliða]; Ἀργολίς Argolís [arɡolís] in ancient Greek and Katharevousa) is one of the regional units of Greece. It is part of the region of Peloponnese, situated in the eastern part of the Peloponnese peninsula and part of the tripoint area of Argolis, Arcadia and Corinthia. Much of the territory of this region is situated in the Argolid Peninsula.

== Geography ==
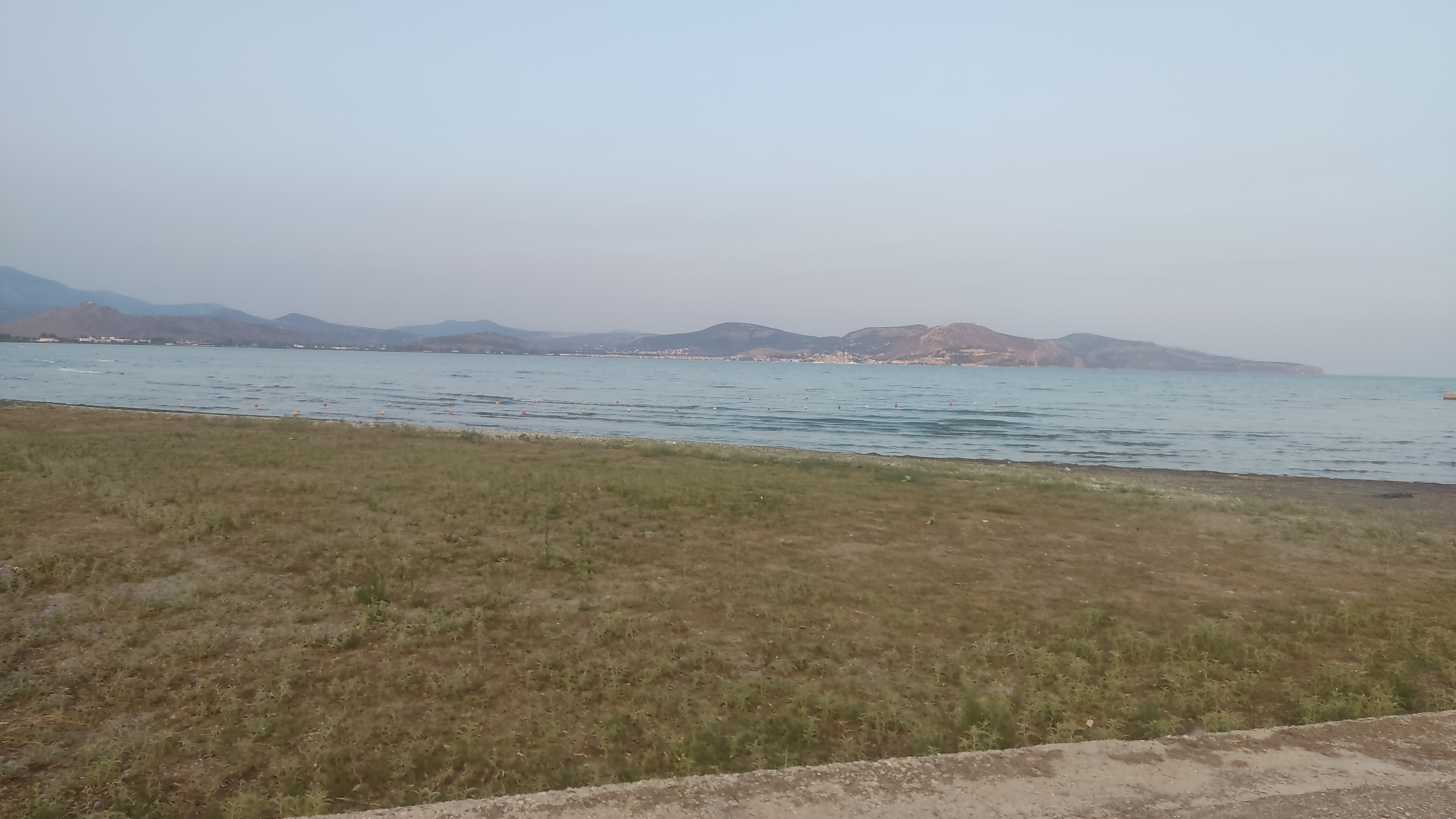
View of the Argolic gulf, with Nafplio visible

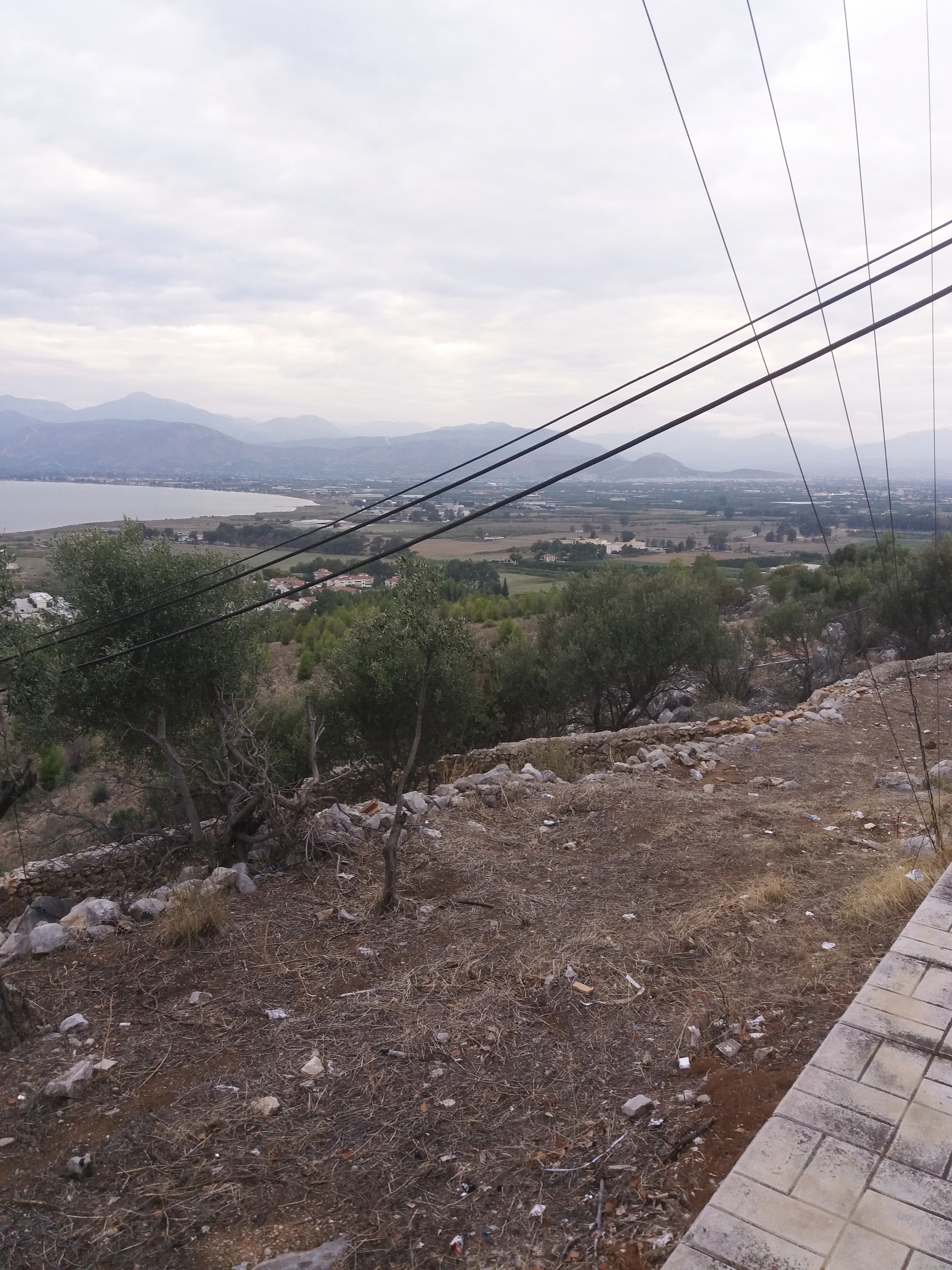
The Argolic plain as seen from the city of Nafplio

Most arable land lies in the central part of Argolis. Its primary agricultural resources are oranges and olives. Argolis has a coastline on the Saronic Gulf in the northeast and on the Argolic Gulf in the south and southeast. Notable mountains ranges are the Oligyrtos in the northwest, Lyrkeio and Ktenia in the west, and Arachnaio and Didymo in the east.

Argolis has land borders with Arcadia to the west and southwest, Corinthia to the north, and the Islands regional unit (Troezen area) to the east. Ancient Argolis included Troezen.

== History ==
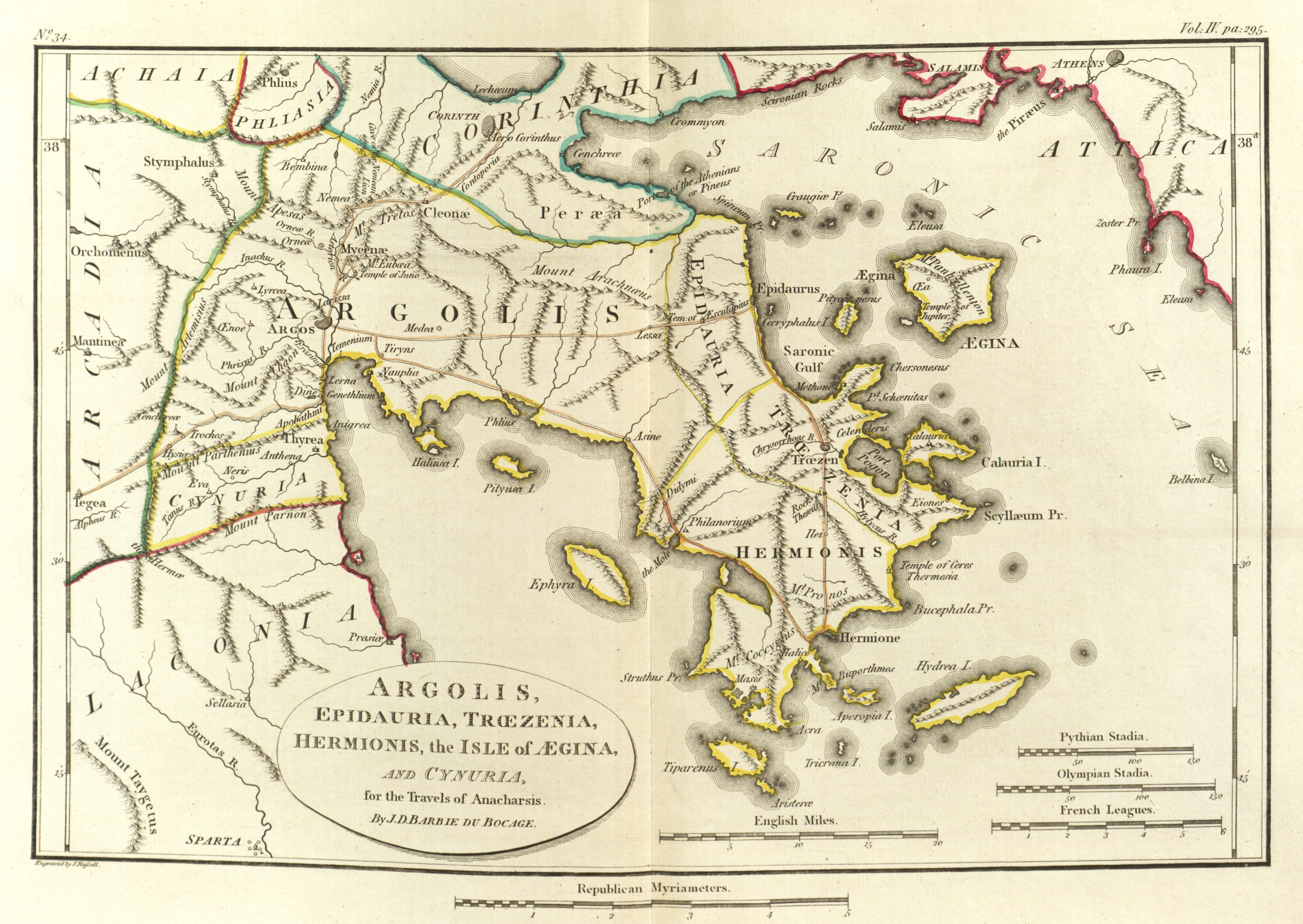
Map of ancient Argolis

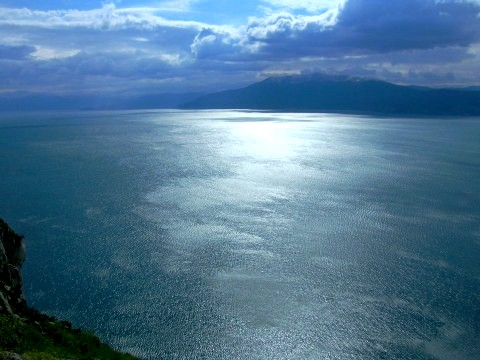
Argolic Gulf

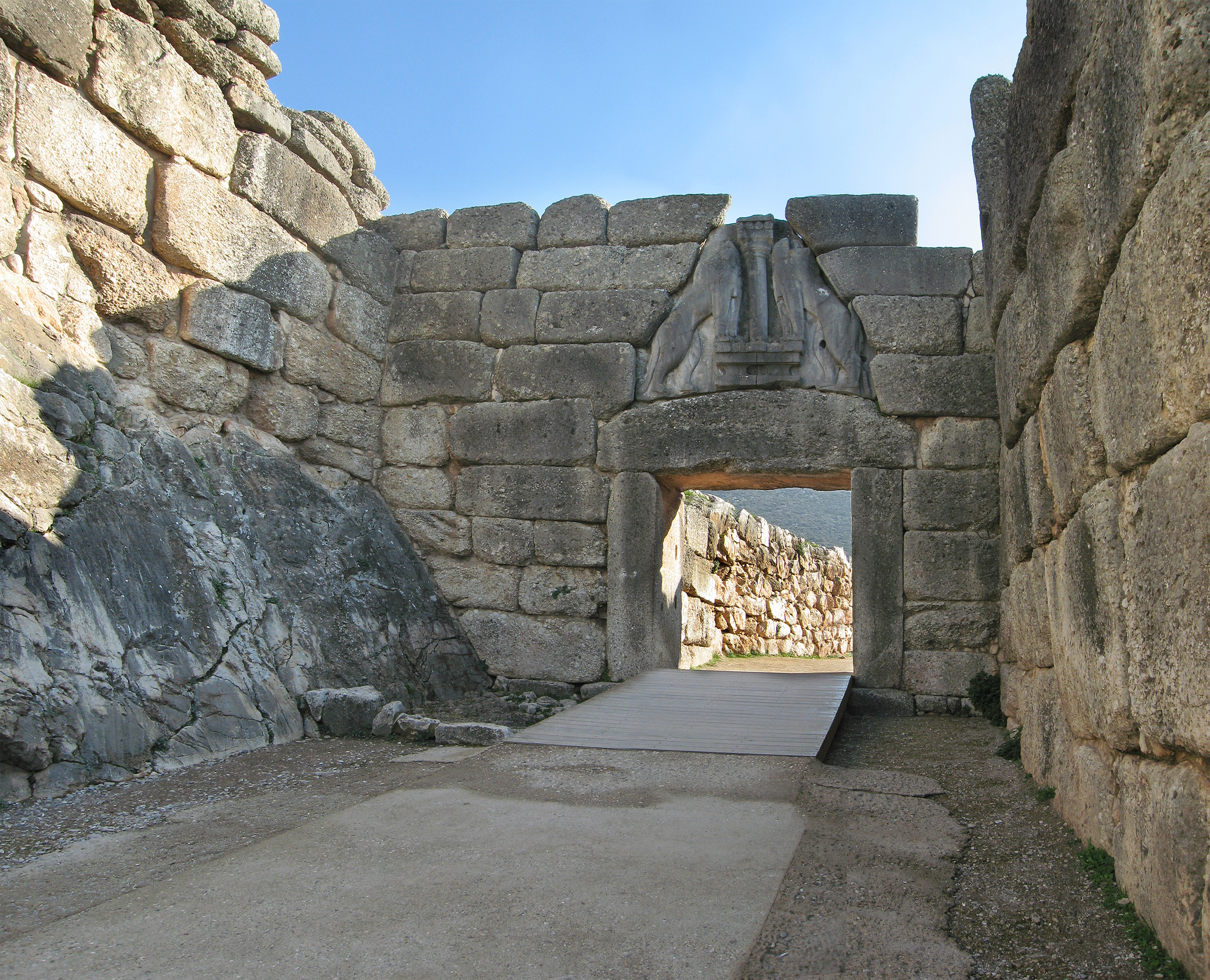
Mycenae

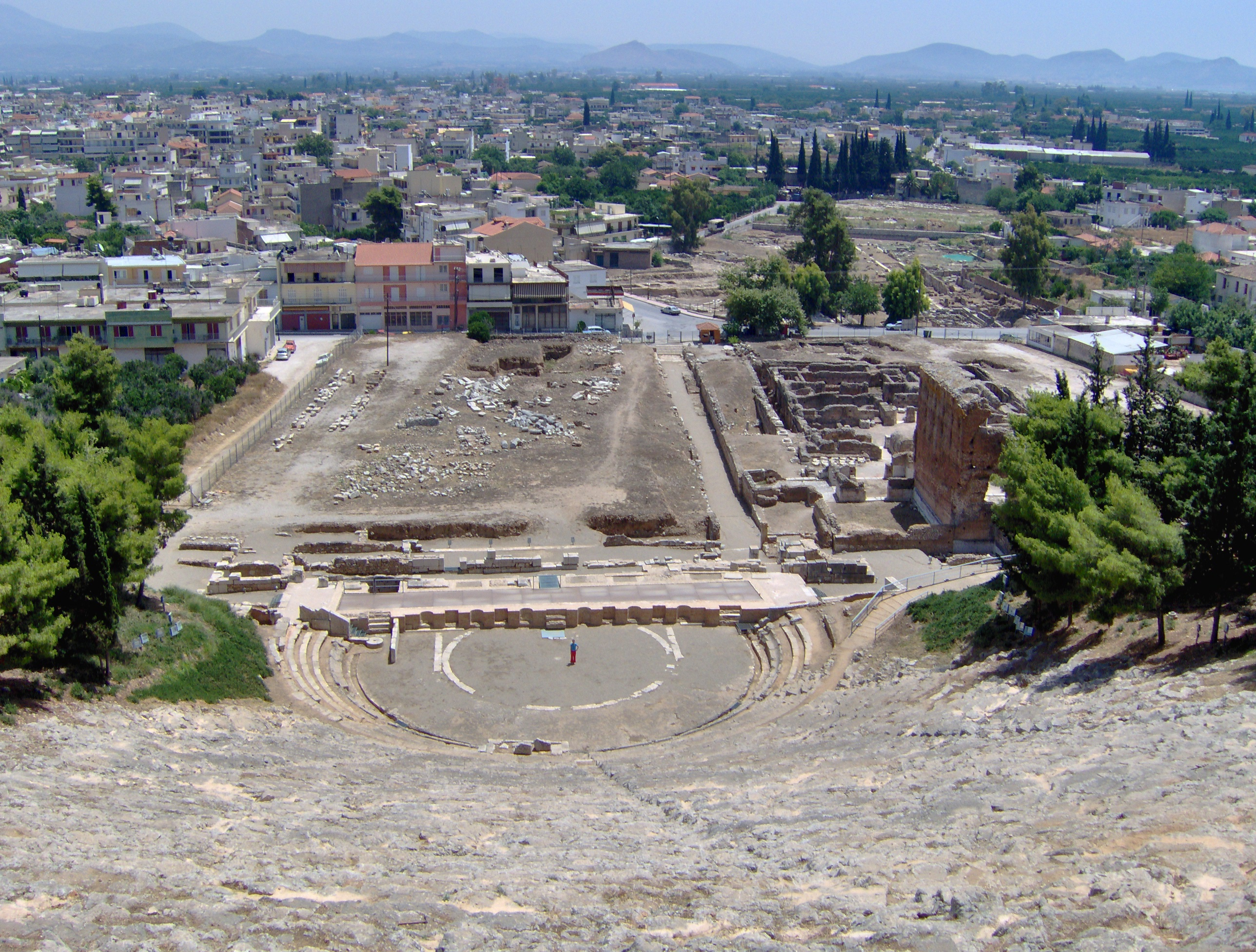
View of Argos

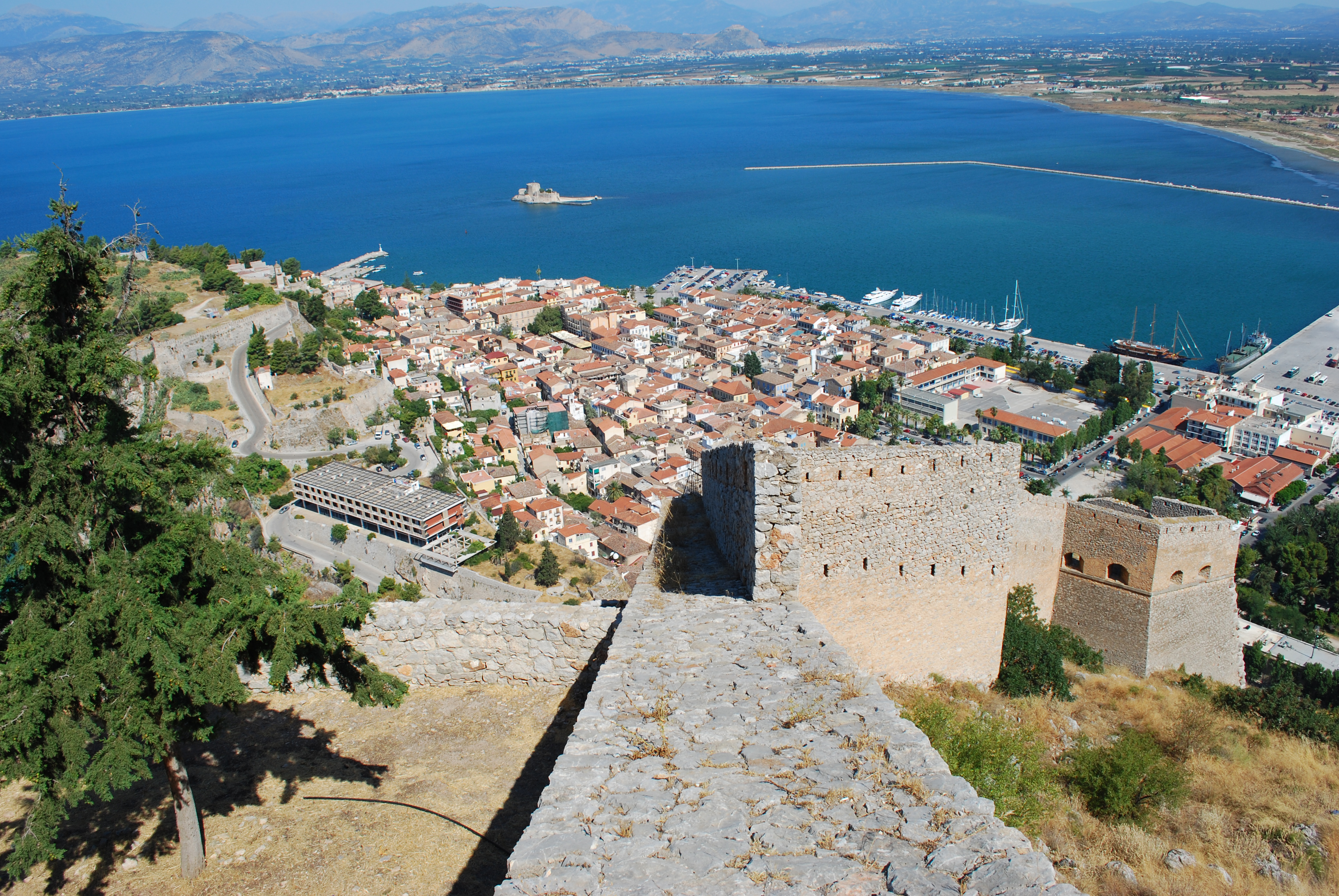
Nafplion

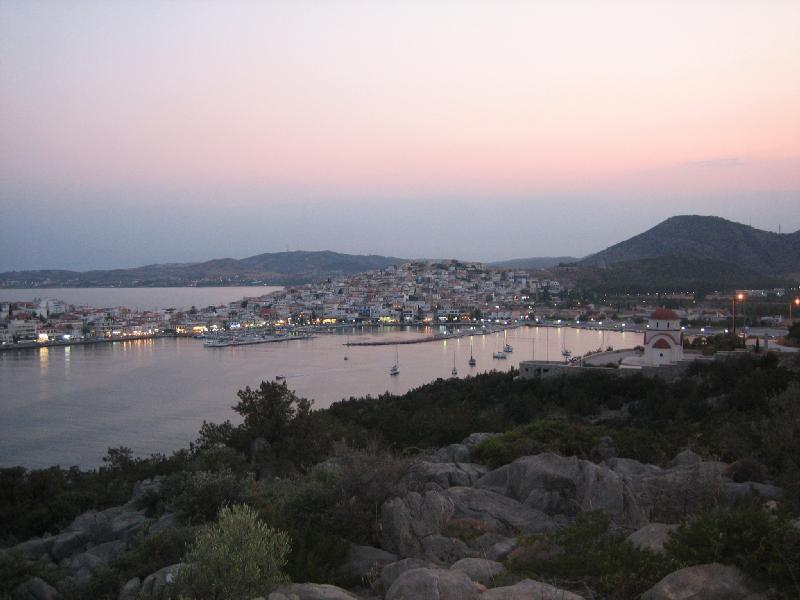
Ermioni

Parts of the history of the area can be found in the articles on Argos, Mycenae, Epidaurus, Nafplio, Troezen, Ermioni, Kranidi, Tiryns and Tolo.

=== Modern history ===
From 1833 to 1899, Argolis was part of Argolidocorinthia, which included present Corinthia, Hydra, Spetses and Kythira. It joined Corinthia to form Argolidocorinthia again in 1909. Forty years later, in 1949, Argolis was finally separated from Corinthia.

== Administration ==
The regional unit Argolis is subdivided into 4 municipalities. These are (number as in the map in the infobox):

- Argos-Mykines (2)
- Epidaurus (Epidavros, 3)
- Ermionida (4)
- Nafplio (1)

=== Prefecture ===
As a part of the 2011 Kallikratis government reform, the regional unit Argolis was created out of the former prefecture Argolis (Greek: Νομός Αργολίδας). The prefecture had the same territory as the present regional unit. At the same time, the municipalities were reorganised, according to the table below.

New municipality	Old municipalities	Seat
Argos-Mykines	Argos	Argos
Argos-Mykines	Achladokampos	Argos
Argos-Mykines	Alea	Argos
Argos-Mykines	Koutsopodi	Argos
Argos-Mykines	Lerna	Argos
Argos-Mykines	Lyrkeia	Argos
Argos-Mykines	Mykines	Argos
Argos-Mykines	Nea Kios	Argos
Epidaurus (Epidavros)	Epidaurus	Lygourio
Epidaurus (Epidavros)	Asklipieio	Lygourio
Ermionida	Ermioni	Kranidi
Ermionida	Kranidi	Kranidi
Nafplio	Nafplio	Nafplio
Nafplio	Asini	Nafplio
Nafplio	Midea	Nafplio
Nafplio	Nea Tiryntha	Nafplio

=== Provinces ===
The provinces of Argolis were:

- Argos Province – Argos
- Ermionida Province – Kranidi
- Nafplia Province – Nafplio

== Transport ==
The area is connected by highways:

- E65 (northwest)
- Greek National Road 7
- Greek National Road 70 (east)

== Communications ==
=== Newspapers ===
- Argeiakon Bima – Argos
- Ta Nea tis Argolidos – Nafplio

=== Radio ===
- Argaiki Radiofonia – Argos
- Argos Radio Deejay – Argos – 96.2 FM
- Cool FM – Argos, Kefalari – 90.7 FM
- Dimotiko Radiofoniou Nafpliou – Nafplio
- Orange FM – Argos – 91.1 FM
- Radio Argolida – Nafplio – 90.2 FM
- Radio Ermionida – Ermioni
- Radio Kranidi – Kranidi
- Style 89.6 – Argos – 89.6 FM

== See also ==
- List of settlements in Argolis
- List of traditional Greek place names

== Sources ==
- Jameson, Michael H.; Runnels, Curtis Neil; van Andel, Tjeerd Hendrik (1994). A Greek Countryside: The Southern Argolid from Prehistory to the Present Day. Stanford University Press. ISBN 978-0-804716086.
- Sutton, Susan Buck, ed. (2000). Contingent Countryside: Settlement, Economy, and Land Use in the Southern Argolid Since 1700. Stanford University Press. ISBN 978-0-804733151.
