= Alea =

Alea or ALEA may refer to:

== Places in Greece ==
- Alea (Arcadia), a town of ancient Arcadia, located near the modern town in Argolis
- Alea (Thessaly), a town of ancient Thessaly
- Alea, Arcadia, a village in the municipal unit Tegea, Arcadia
- Alea, Argolis, a small town in Argolis

== Organisations ==
- Alabama Law Enforcement Agency (ALEA)
- American Law and Economics Association (ALEA)

== Other uses ==
- Alea (Greek soldier), origin of the word aleatoire (meaning "random")
- Alea (game), the earliest known tables game and possible ancestor of backgammon
- Alea, originally a game-publishing subsidiary of Ravensburger, purchased by Heidelburger
- ALEA Ensemble, an Austrian ensemble for contemporary music
- Athena Alea, an epithet of goddess Athena.

== See also ==
- Alea iacta est
- Alia (disambiguation)
