= List of highways numbered 66 =

The following highways are numbered 66:

== International ==
- European route E66

== Australia ==
- Barkly Highway (Northern Territory)
- Riddoch Highway

== Canada ==
- Alberta Highway 66
- Highway 66 (Ontario)

== Cuba ==
- Autopista Sancti Spiritus (4-66)

== Finland ==
- Kantatie 66 (Orivesi — Lapua)

== France ==
- A66 autoroute

== Germany ==
- Bundesautobahn 66

== Greece ==
- Greek National Road 66, between Nemea station and Levidi via Skoteini

== Hungary ==
- 66-os főút (Kaposvár – Pécs)

== India ==
- National Highway 66 (India)

== Ireland ==
- N66

== Israel ==
- Highway 66 (Israel)

== Malaysia ==
- Malaysia Federal Route 66

== Philippines ==
- N66 highway (Philippines)

== Slovakia ==
- Road 66 (Slovakia), from Slovak – Hungarian border at Šahy to Tatras mountain

== Spain ==
- Autovía A-66 (Silver Route)

== United Arab Emirates ==
- E 66

== United Kingdom ==
- A66 road
- M66 motorway

== United States ==
- Interstate 66, a highway connecting Interstate 81 in Virginia, to Washington, DC
  - Interstate 66 (Kansas–Kentucky), a former proposed highway to connect Kansas with Kentucky
- U.S. Route 66, the most common meaning. Since 1985, when US 66 was decommissioned, several states where US 66 passed have re-commissioned part of the former route in that state as a state route 66. In the list of state routes 66 below, those marked with an asterisk (*) have a connection with the former US 66.
- Alabama State Route 66
- Arizona State Route 66*
- Arkansas Highway 66
- California State Route 66*
  - County Route 66 (San Bernardino County, California)*
- Colorado State Highway 66
- Connecticut Route 66
- Florida State Road 66
- Georgia State Route 66
- Hawaii Route 66
- Idaho State Highway 66
- Illinois Route 66 (former)
- Indiana State Road 66
- Iowa Highway 66
- K-66 (Kansas highway)*
- Kentucky Route 66
- Louisiana Highway 66
- Maryland Route 66
- Massachusetts Route 66
- M-66 (Michigan highway)
- Minnesota State Highway 66
  - County Road 66 (Hennepin County, Minnesota)
- Missouri Route 66*
  - Missouri Route 66 (1922) (former)
- Montana Highway 66
- Nebraska Highway 66
  - Nebraska Spur 66A
  - Nebraska Spur 66C
  - Nebraska Spur 66D
  - Nebraska Spur 66E
- Nevada State Route 66 (former)
- New Jersey Route 66
- New York State Route 66
  - County Route 66A (Cayuga County, New York)
    - County Route 66B (Cayuga County, New York)
  - County Route 66 (Chautauqua County, New York)
  - County Route 66 (Dutchess County, New York)
  - County Route 66 (Jefferson County, New York)
  - County Route 66 (Monroe County, New York)
  - County Route 66 (Onondaga County, New York)
  - County Route 66 (Putnam County, New York)
  - County Route 66 (Rensselaer County, New York)
  - County Route 66 (Saratoga County, New York)
  - County Route 66 (Schoharie County, New York)
  - County Route 66 (Suffolk County, New York)
  - County Route 66 (Sullivan County, New York)
  - County Route 66A (Westchester County, New York)
- North Carolina Highway 66
- North Dakota Highway 66
- Ohio State Route 66
- Oklahoma State Highway 66*
  - Oklahoma State Highway 66B*
- Oregon Route 66
- Pennsylvania Route 66
- Puerto Rico Highway 66
- South Carolina Highway 66
- Tennessee State Route 66
- Texas State Highway 66
  - Texas State Highway Loop 66 (former)
  - Texas State Highway Spur 66
  - Farm to Market Road 66
  - Texas Park Road 66
- U.S. Virgin Islands Highway 66
- Utah State Route 66
- Vermont Route 66
- Virginia State Route 66 (former)
- West Virginia Route 66
- Wisconsin Highway 66

== See also ==
- A66 (disambiguation)

Preceded by 65	Lists of highways 66	Succeeded by 67
