= Aleus =

Mythological king of Arcadia

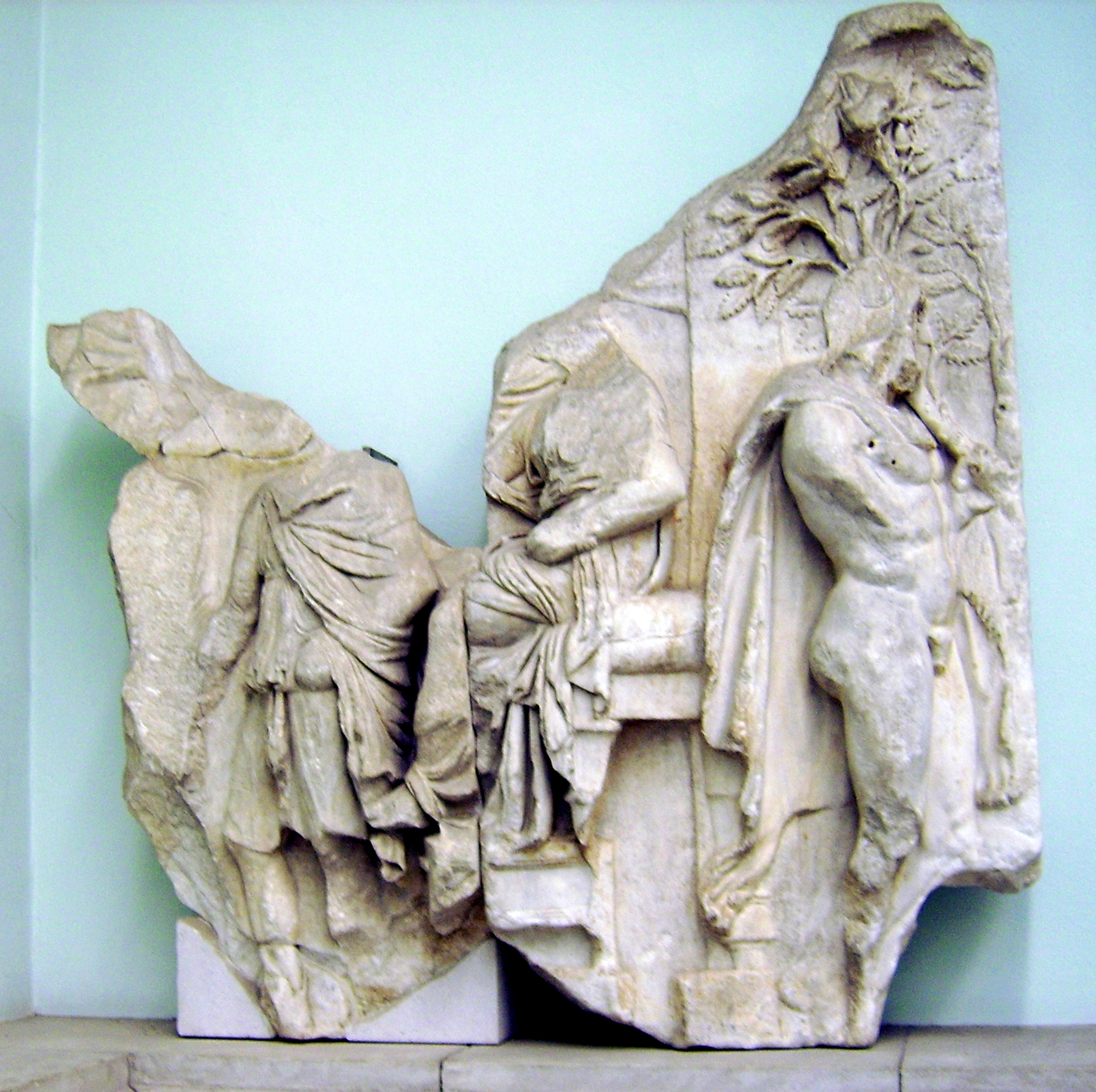
Sculpture of Heracles at the court of Aleos

In Greek mythology, Aleus (or Aleos) (Ancient Greek: Ἀλεός) was the king of Arcadia, eponym of Alea, and founder of the cult of Athena Alea. He was the grandson of Arcas. His daughter Auge was the mother of the hero Telephus, by Heracles. Aleus's sons Amphidamas and Cepheus, and his grandson Ancaeus were Argonauts. Ancaeus was killed by the Calydonian boar.

== Family ==
Aleus was the son of Apheidas whose father was Arcas, the son of Zeus and Callisto, and the eponym of Arcadia. Some accounts make Aleus the brother of Stheneboea, the wife of Proetus. Aleus succeeded his father as king of Tegea in Arcadia, and when Aepytus died, Aleus became king of all Arcadia, with Tegea as his capital. He was said to have been the eponymous founder of the city of Alea. From Aleus also comes, presumably, the epithet Athena Alea, whose temple at Tegea, he was said to have built.

According to various accounts Aleus had three sons, Lycurgus, the Argonauts Amphidamas and Cepheus, and two daughters, Auge, and Alcidice, by either Neaera the daughter of Pereus, or Cleobule.

== Mythology ==
=== Auge and Telephus ===
Aleus's daughter Auge, virgin priestess of Athena Alea, was made pregnant by Heracles, and though Aleus tried to dispose of mother and child, both ended up at the court of king Teuthras in Mysia, with Auge his wife (or by some accounts his adopted daughter) and Telephus his adopted heir. According to one account, the Delphic oracle had warned Aleus that if his daughter had a son, then this grandson would kill Aleus's sons, so Aleus made Auge a priestess of Athena, telling her that she must remain a virgin, on pain of death. But Heracles, passing through Tegea, became enamored of Auge and while drunk had sex with her. In some accounts, Aleus discovered that Auge was pregnant and gave her to Nauplius to be drowned, but instead Nauplius sold her to Teuthras. Others say that Auge had her baby secretly in the temple of Athena at Tegea and hid it there, but that an ensuing plague and investigation caused her to be found out, so Aleus put Auge and Telephus to sea in a wooden chest and cast them adrift.

In some accounts, the infant Telephus arrives together with Auge in Mysia, where he is adopted by Teuthras. In others, Telephus is left behind in Arcadia, having been abandoned on Mount Parthenion, either by Aleus, or by Auge when she was being taken to the sea by Nauplius to be drowned; however, Telephus is suckled by a deer, and eventually reunited with Auge in Mysia many years later. Some accounts have Telephus killing his maternal uncles, the sons of Aleus, thereby fulfilling the oracle, but none say how.

=== Ancaeus ===
When Aleus was an old man, his sons Amphidamas and Cepheus left Tegea to join Jason and the Argonauts on their quest to find the Golden Fleece. Aleus's eldest son Lycurgus stayed home to care for his father, sending his son Ancaeus in his stead. But Aleus, hoping to keep his grandson with him safe at home, hid all of Ancaeus's implements of war, and so Ancaeus went with Jason wearing a bearskin, and wielding a double-sided axe. Later Ancaeus joined the hunt for the Calydonian boar, but was killed when the beast gored him. At the time of Pausanias, the scene was depicted on the front gable of the temple of Athena Alea at Teage, with Ancaeus shown wounded, supported by Epochus, next to his dropped axe.

The story of Aleus and his grandson Ancaeus shares similarities with the story told by Herodotus about Croesus and his son Atys. Croesus had dreamed that Atys would be killed by a spear. Because of this, to keep Atys safe, Croesus locked away all of his son's weaponry. A wild boar began to ravage the countryside and when a hunt was organized to rid the land of the raging beast, Croeus would not let his son join. However Atys said the boar would surely not kill him using a spear. So Croesus relented, and Atys was killed by a spear thrown by a fellow hunter.
