= Auge =

Daughter of Aleus in Greek mythology

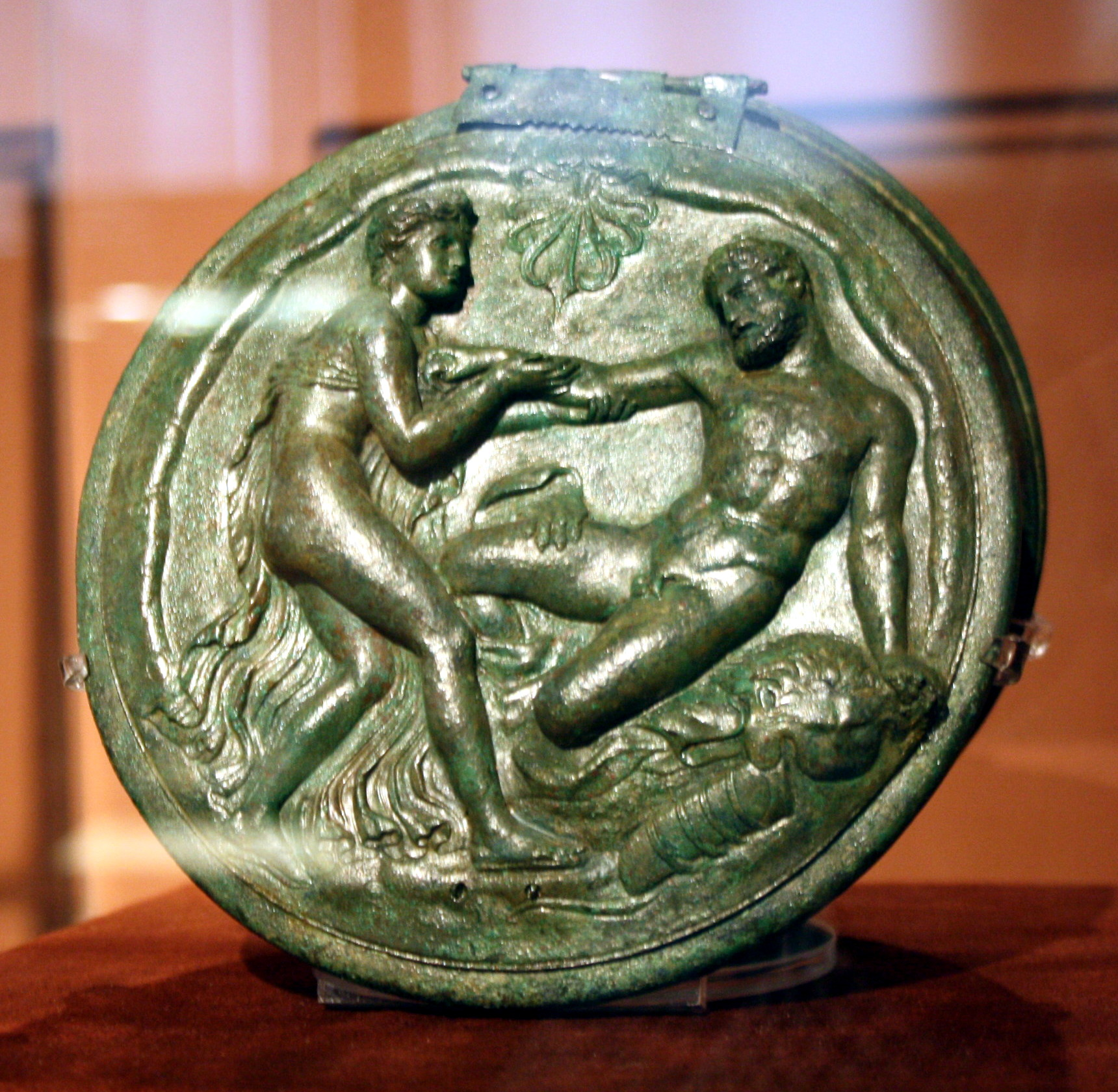
Auge and a drunken Heracles, bronze mirror case from Elis (c. 325 BC). National Archaeological Museum, Athens, Stathatos 312.

In Greek mythology, Auge (/ˈɔːdʒiː/; Ancient Greek: Αὐγή, romanized: Augḗ, lit. 'sunbeam, daylight, dawn';), was the daughter of Aleus the king of Tegea in Arcadia, and the virgin priestess of Athena Alea. She was also the mother of the hero Telephus by Heracles.

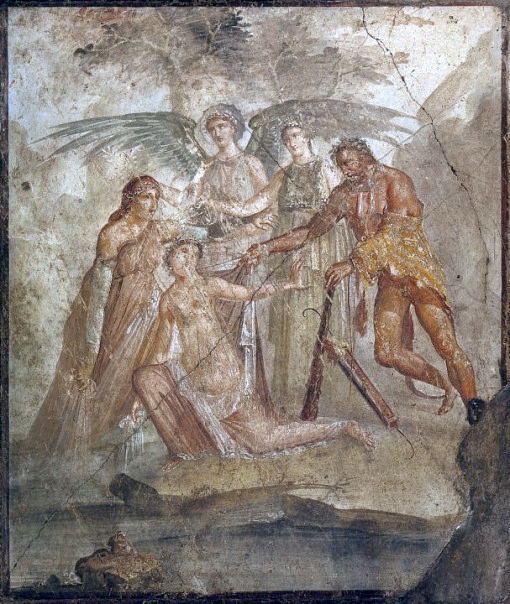
Heracles and Auge, antique fresco in Pompeii

Auge had sex with Heracles (either willingly, or by force) and was made pregnant. When Aleus found this out, by various accounts, he ordered Auge drowned, or sold as a slave, or shut up in a wooden chest and thrown into the sea (similar to Princess Danaë of Argos, mother of Perseus). However, in all these accounts, she and her son Telephus end up at the court of the Mysian king Teuthras, where Auge becomes the wife (or the adopted daughter) of Teuthras, and Telephus becomes Teuthras’ adopted son and heir.

== Family ==
Auge was the daughter of Aleus, the grandson of Arcas, who was the son of Zeus and Callisto. Aleus was the king of Arcadia and eponym of Alea, and was said to have been the founder of the cult of Athena Alea and the builder of Temple of Athena Alea at his capital of Tegea. According to the mythographer Apollodorus, Auge's mother was Neaera, the daughter of Pereus.

== Mythology ==
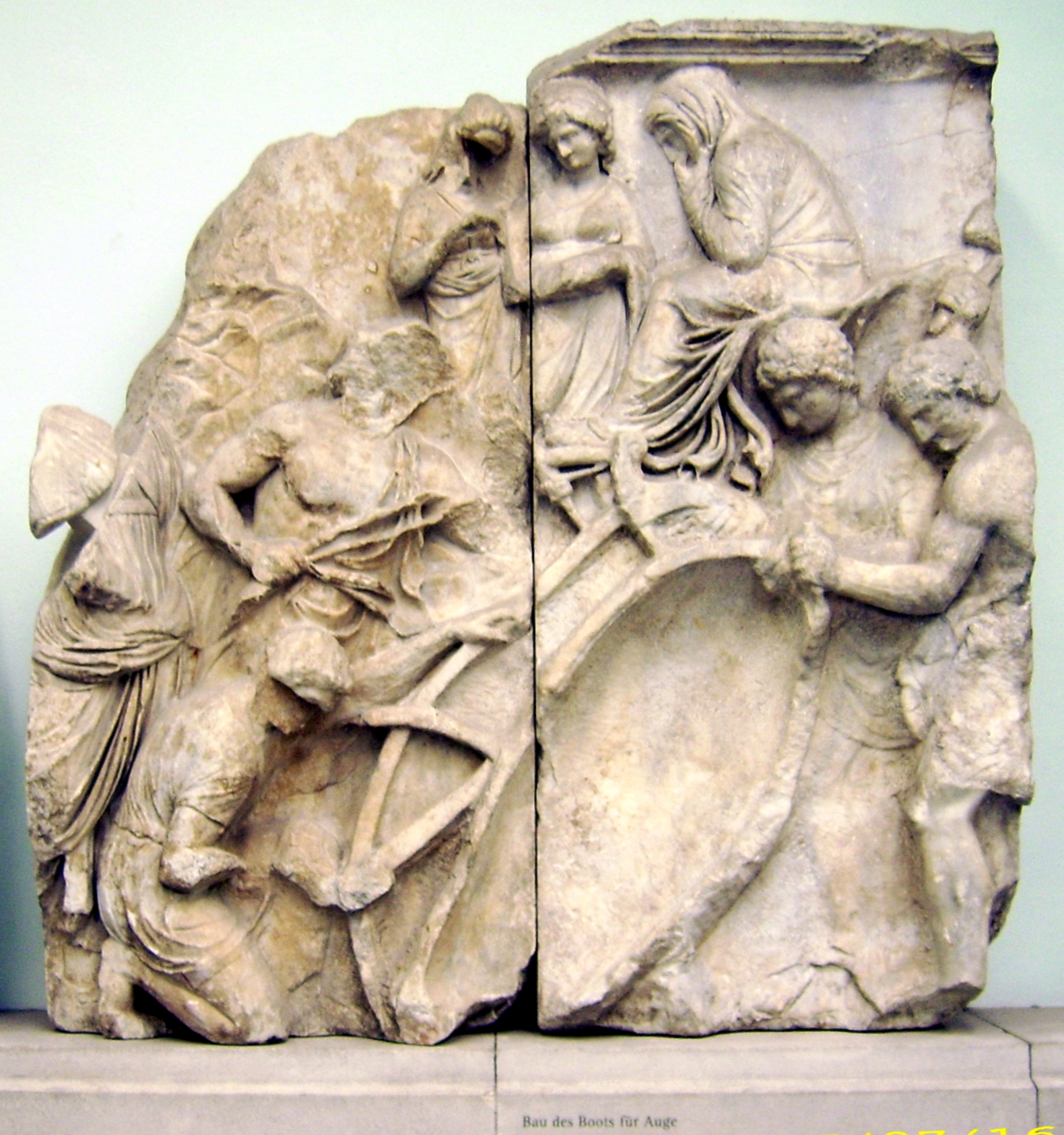
Carpenters building a boat in which to send Auge into the sea. Part of Pergamon altar

=== From Arcadia to Mysia ===
There were many versions of Auge's story. A surviving fragment of the Hesiodic Catalogue of Women (6th c. BC), representing perhaps the oldest tradition, tells us that, Auge having arrived in Mysia (it doesn't say how), the gods appeared before king Teuthras and commanded him to receive her at his court in Mysia. So, according to this account, Teuthras raised Auge as a daughter, and It was in Mysia that Heracles, while seeking the horses of Laomedon, seduced Auge and fathered Telephus.

All other accounts place the seduction (or in later accounts, the rape) of Auge by Heracles and Telephus' birth in Arcadia, in the Peloponnese of mainland Greece. The oldest such account (c. 490–480 BC), by the historian and geographer Hecataeus, says that Heracles used to have sex with Auge whenever he came to Tegea. We are told this by the 2nd century geographer Pausanias, who goes on to say, perhaps drawing upon Hecataeus, that when Aleus discovered that Auge had given birth to Telephus, he shut mother and child up in a chest and threw it into the sea. The chest made its way from Arcadia to the Caicus river in Asia Minor, where the local king Teuthras married Auge.

Sophocles, in the fifth century BC, wrote a tragedy Aleadae (The sons of Aleus), which told the story of Auge and Telephus. The play is lost and only fragments now remain, but a declamation attributed to the fourth century BC orator Alcidamas probably used Sophocles' Aleadae for one of its sources. According to Alcidamas, Auge's father Aleus had been warned by the Delphic oracle that if she had a son, then her son would kill Aleus' sons, so Aleus made Auge a priestess of Athena, telling her she must remain a virgin, on pain of death. But Heracles passing through Tegea, being entertained by Aleus in the temple of Athena, became enamored of Auge and while drunk had sex with her. Aleus discovered that Auge was pregnant and gave her to Nauplius to be drowned. But, on the way to the sea, Auge gave birth to Telephus on Mount Parthenion, and according to Alcidamas, Nauplius, ignoring his orders, sold mother and child to the childless Mysian king Teuthras, who married Auge and adopted Telephus. Alcidamas' version of the story must have diverged from Sophocles in at least this last respect. For, rather than the infant Telephus being sold to Teuthras, as in Alcidamas, an Aleadae fragment seems to insure that in the Sophoclean play, as in many later accounts (see below), the new-born Telephus was instead abandoned on Mount Parthenion, where he is suckled by a deer.

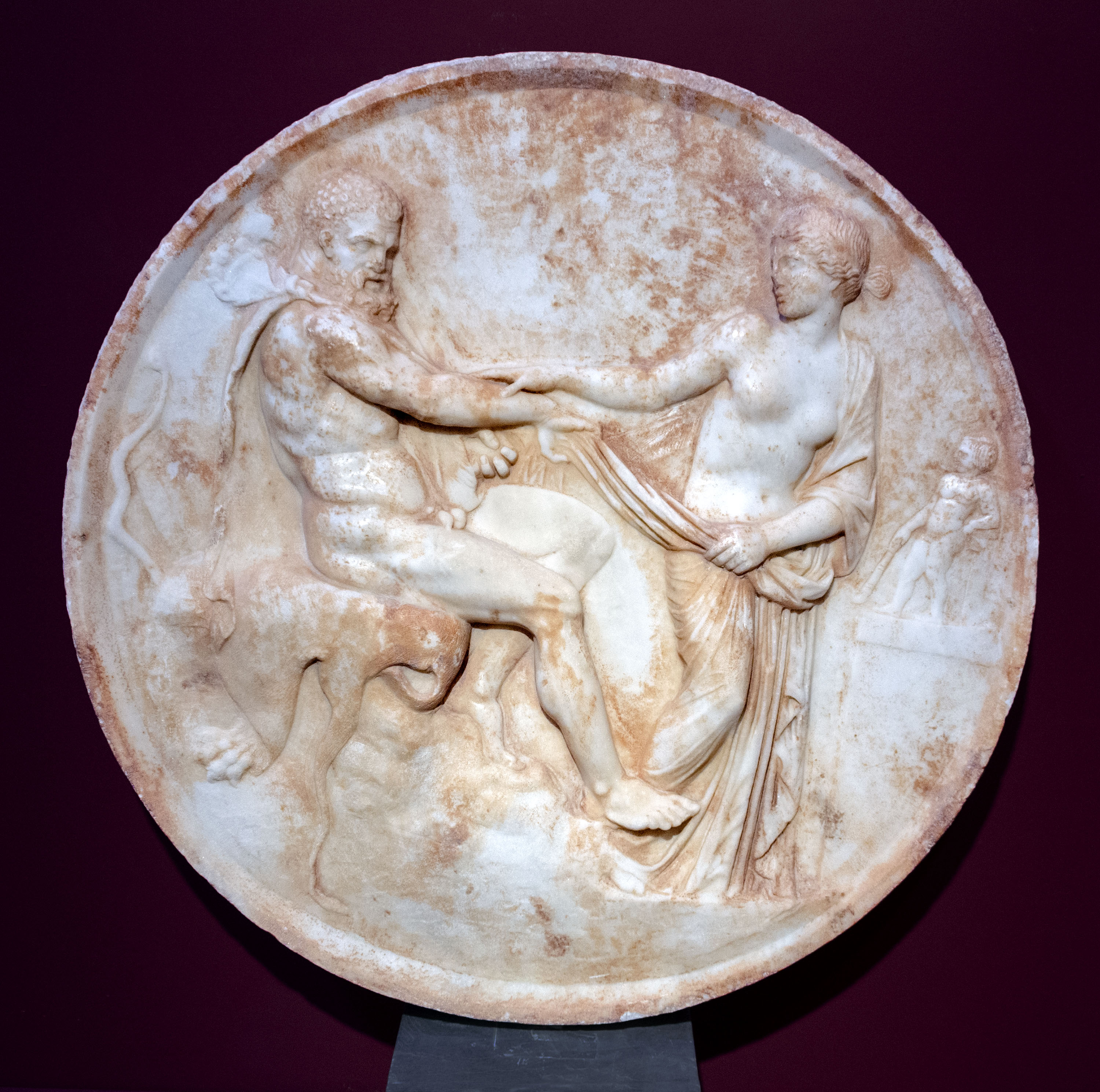
Ancient tondo depicting Heracles grabbing Auge, 2nd century BC, from Arcadia.

Euripides wrote a play Auge (408 BC?) which dealt with her story. The play is lost, but a summary of the plot can be pieced together from various later sources, in particular a narrative summary, given by the Armenian historian Moses of Chorene. A drunken Heracles, during a festival of Athena, rapes "Athena's priestess Auge, daughter of Aleus, as she conducted the dances during the nocturnal rites." Auge gives birth secretly in Athena's temple at Tegea, and hides the new-born child there. The child is discovered, and Aleus orders Telephus exposed and Auge to be drowned, but Heracles returns and apparently saves the pair from immediate death, and the play perhaps ended with the assurance (from Athena to Heracles?) that Auge and Telephus would be wife and son to Teuthras.

Strabo, gives a version of the story similar to Pausanias', saying that, after discovering "her ruin by Heracles", Aleus put Auge and Telephus into a chest and cast it into the sea, that it washed up at the mouth of the Caicus, and that Teuthras married Auge, and adopted Telephus.

The later accounts of the 1st century BC Historian Diodorus Siculus and the 1st or 2nd century AD mythographer Apollodorus add additional details, as well as provide slight variations. Diodorus, adds that Aleus did not believe Auge when she told him that Heracles was the father. As in Alcidamas, Diodorus says that Aleus gave Auge to Nauplius to be drowned and that Auge gave birth to Telephus near Mount Parthenion. But instead of selling Auge, as in Alkidamas, according to Diodorus, Nauplius gave Auge to "some Carians" who took her to Mysia and gave her to Teuthras. According to Apollordorus, Heracles did not know that Auge was the daughter of Aleus when he had sex with her. As in Euripides' Auge, Apollodorus says that Auge delivered her baby secretly in Athena's temple, and hid it there. Apollodorus adds that an ensuing famine, was declared by an oracle to be the result of some impiety in the temple, and a search of the temple caused Auge to be found out. As in Sophocles' account, Apollodorus says that Aleus gave Auge to Nauplius to be disposed of. In one place Apollodorus says that Aleus gave Nauplius Auge "to sell far away in a foreign land", while in another he says "to be put to death". But in either case, Nauplius instead gave Auge to Teuthras who married her.

=== Telephus ===
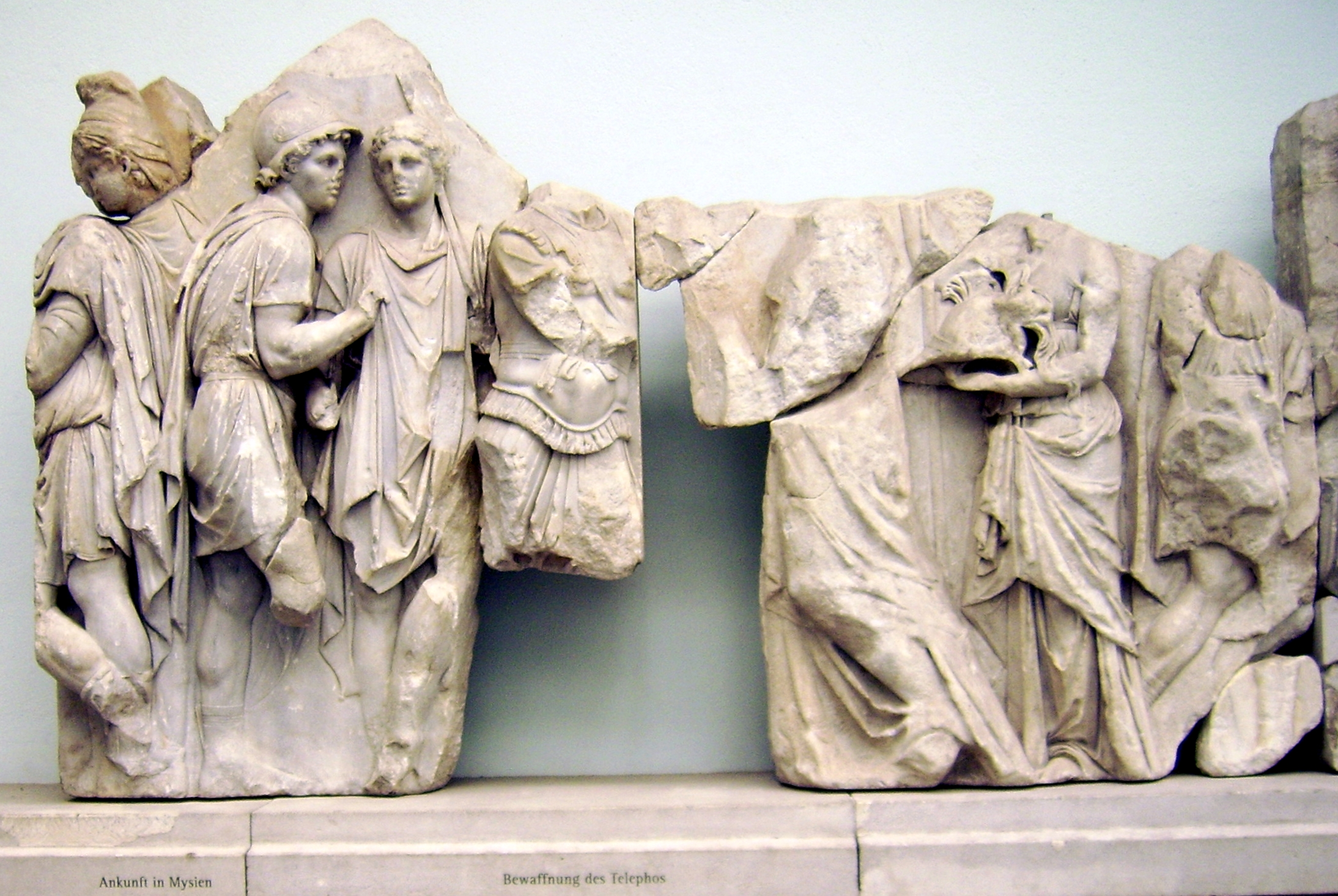
Telephus receives weapons from Auge. Part of the Pergamon Altar. Telephus is the middle figure here, only partially preserved. He is wearing a cuirass

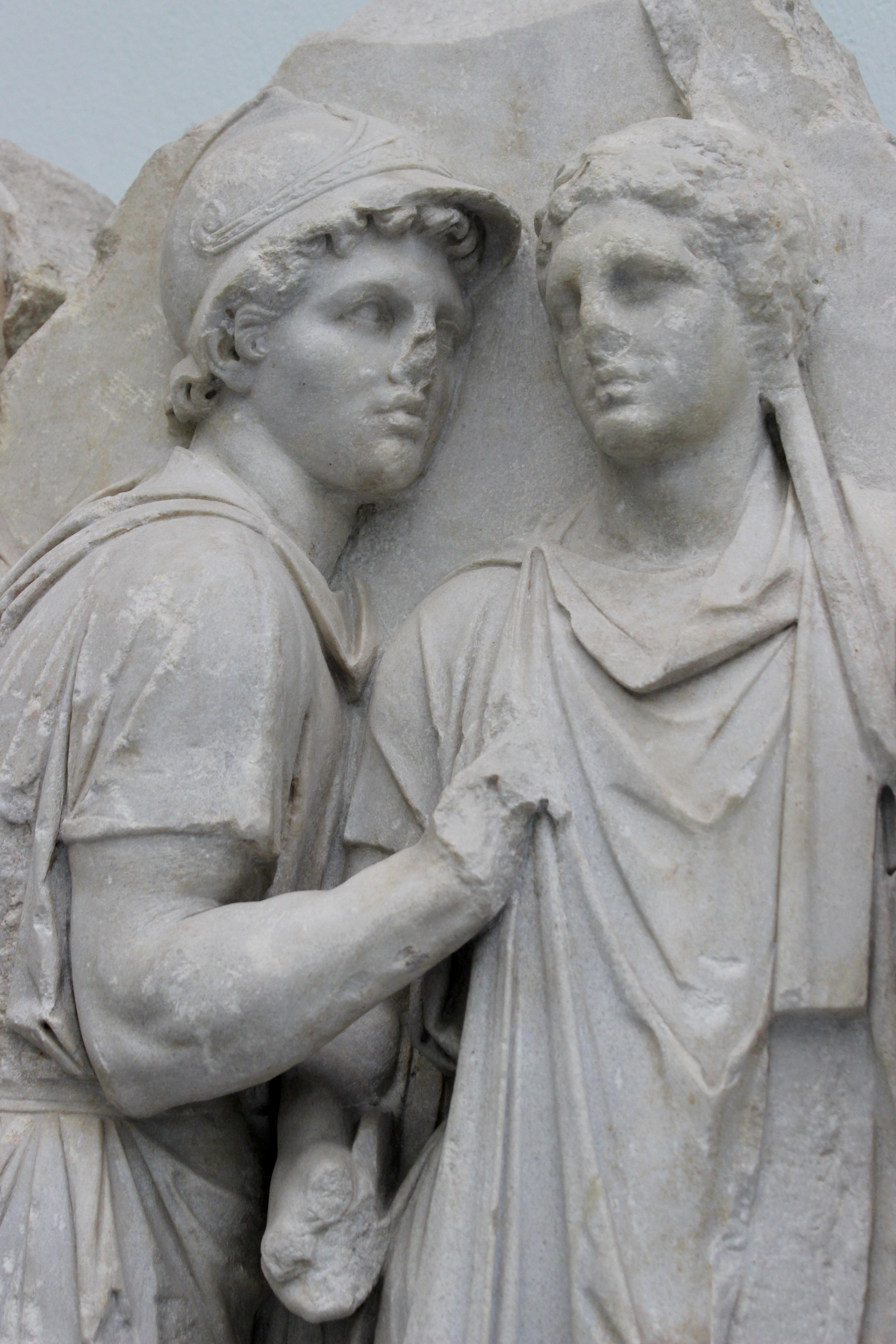
Detail of the frieze "Telephus receives weapons from Auge". Two male attendants standing near Telephus

As mentioned above, in the Catalogue of Women, Telephus is born in Mysia, while in Euripides' Auge, as well as the accounts of Strabo and Alcidamas, the infant Telephus arrives together with Auge in Mysia, where he is adopted by Teuthras. But in other accounts, Telephus is left behind in Arcadia, having been abandoned on Mount Parthenion, either by Aleus, or by Auge when she was being taken to the sea by Nauplius to be drowned. However Telephus is suckled by a deer and found, and raised by King Corythus, or his herdsmen. Seeking knowledge of his mother, Telephus consulted the Delphic oracle which directed him to Mysia, where he was reunited with Auge and adopted by Teuthras.

According to the mythographer Hyginus (whose account is apparently taken from an older tragic source, probably Sophocles' Mysians), after Auge abandoned Telephus on Mount Parthenion she fled to Mysia where, as in the Catalogue of Women, she became the adopted daughter (not wife) of Teuthras. When Telephus goes to Mysia on the instruction of the oracle, Teuthras promises him his kingdom and his daughter Auge in marriage if he would defeat his enemy Idas. This Telephus did, but Auge still faithful to Heracles, attacked Telephus with a sword in their wedding chamber, but the gods intervened sending a serpent to separate them, causing Auge to drop her sword. Just as Telephus was about to kill Auge, she called out to Heracles for rescue and Telephus then recognized his mother.

== Iconography ==
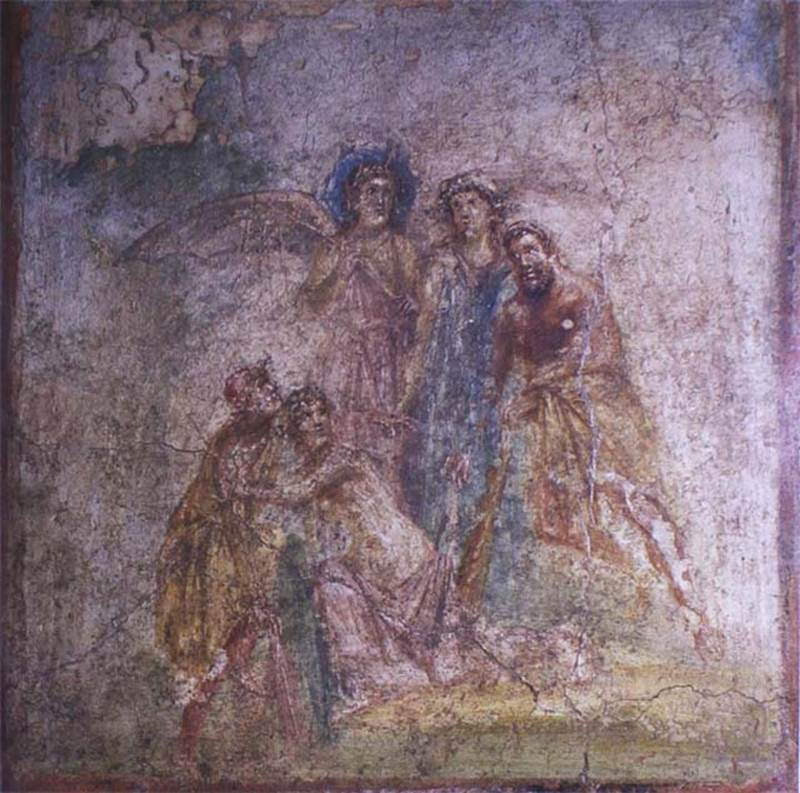
Heracles and Auge, antique fresco in Pompeii, now in the Naples Archaeological Museum

The 2nd century geographer Pausanias names Auge as one of many figures appearing in the Nekyia ("Underworld"), a large mural by Polygnotus which decorated one of the interior walls of the 5th century BC Lesche of the Knidians, a building near the Cassotis spring at Delphi. However Pausanias's identification of Auge has been questioned.

The earliest certain representation of Auge occurred on the frieze of the temple of Athena Alea at Tegea (finished c. 350–340 BC). Inscriptions show that Auge and Telephus were represented on the metopes of the temple. Pausanias mentions seeing a portrait painting of Auge at the same temple. Also at Tegea, Pausanias, describes an image of Auge on her knees, at the temple of Eileithyia, the goddess of childbirth. According to the Tegeans it was at this place that Auge "fell on her knees" and gave birth to Telephus, while she was being taken to the sea by Nauplius.

According to Pausanias, the tomb of Auge was still shown at Pergamon, where the Attalids venerated Telephus as a founding hero. Pausanias describes the tomb as "a mound of earth surrounded by a basement of stone and surmounted by a figure of a naked woman in bronze". Auge also figures in several panels of the Telephus frieze on the 2nd century BC Great Altar of Pergamon: being seen by Heracles in the sanctuary of Athena (panel 3); waiting shrouded and mournful, as carpenters build the wooden vessel she will be shut up in, and cast adrift at sea (panels 5 and 6); being found on the shore by Teuthras (panel 10); establishing the cult of Athena (panel 11); arming Telephus (panels 16, 17); being given in marriage to Telephus, by Teuthras (panel 20); and recognizing and being recognized by Telephus (panel 21).

Pompeian frescoes (1st century AD) show Auge being raped while washing clothing at a spring.

== See also ==
Other women associated with the defilement of a goddess' temple:

- Medusa
- Cassandra
- Comaetho
