= Temple of Athena Alea =

Ancient temple in Peloponnese, Greece

Coordinates: 37°27′19.7″N 22°25′13.5″E

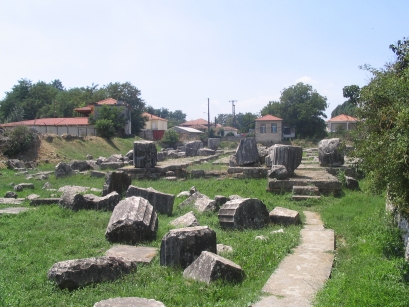
The temple of Athena Alea at Tegea (2009)

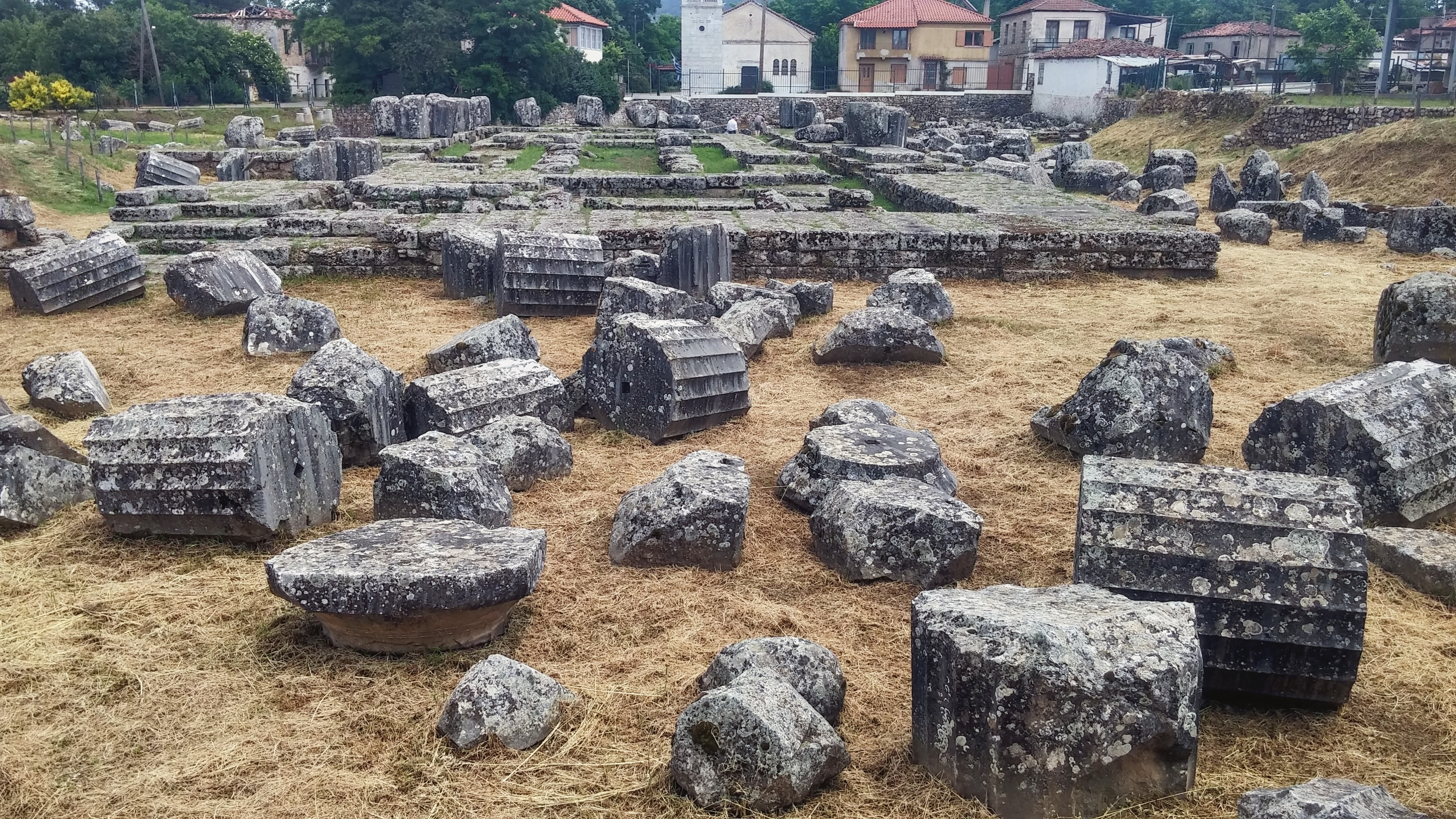
The temple in 2017

The Temple of Athena Alea was a sanctuary at Tegea in Ancient Greece, dedicated to Athena under the epithet Athena Alea; a syncretization between the Olympian goddess Athena and the local deity Alea. It was a significant Greek temple, and played a crucial part as an identity marker for the ancient Tegeans. It served as the focal point of a significant area already from tenth century BCE, and has provided evidence of contact with several nearby regions such as the Argolid and Laconia.

== History ==
According to the Greek travel writer Pausanias, the temple was said to have been built by the local hero Aleus, the son of Apheidas. The name of this hero is etymologically associated with the goddess Alea, and may be a genealogical retrojection to explain the origin of the temple in later history. This would then indicate that the traditions of the local goddess by the time of Pausanias was almost forgotten, and a new heroic character had been invented to fill her place.

The first temple at the site likely dates to the early Archaic period of Greek history; the memory of this temple survived, and is included in the account of Pausanias. According to Herodotus, the temple contained chains associated with a failed Spartan attack on Tegea in the sixth century. Pausanias states that this temple burned down 394 BCE, and a second temple was built by the famous Parian architect Scopas; Pausanias also states that this temple was among the most beautiful in the Peloponnese.

The temple of Athena Alea at Tegea was an ancient and revered asylum, and the names of many persons are recorded who saved themselves by seeking refuge in it. Among the famous people seeking asylum at the temple, Pausanias recounts Chryseis, the Spartan Leotychides, and the Spartan general Pausanias.

=== Interior and exterior of the temple ===
The second sanctuary was a temple of the Doric order which in size and splendour was said to surpass all other temples in the Peloponnese, and was surrounded by a triple row of columns of different orders. Pausanias description of this temple states that the first row is pillars were of the Doric order, with the next one being Corinthian order, and the outside the temple was pillars of the Ionic order. He goes onto mention iconographical representations of the Calydonian boar hunt and the local hero Telephos' fighting against Achilles on the plain of the Caycus.

The cult statue of the Athena Alea was made by Endoeus in ivory. It was described as "... made throughout of ivory, the work of Endoeus. Those in charge of the curiosities say that one of the boar's tusks has broken off; the remaining one is kept in the gardens of the emperor, in a sanctuary of Dionysus, and is about half a fathom long." The cult statue was subsequently carried to Rome by Augustus to adorn the Forum of Augustus.

The combination of myths on the exterior of the temple is interesting, and speaks of both local Tegean and Panhellenic importance, for example, the representation of the Calydonian Boar Hunt on the east pediment. This myth is associated with Tegea through the role of the Arkadian heroine Atalanta and a set of additional Tegean heroes listed by Pausanias. The inclusion of this glorified the role of Atalanta, speaking to a Panhellenic audience. According to Pausanias, the tusks of the boar were located within the temple until Augustus removed them, and the decayed hide of the animal remained in the sanctuary until his days.

The scene of the local hero Telephos fighting Achilles connected the Tegeans further to larger more famous myths, Telephos was the son of Heracles and Auge, the first priestess of Athena Alea in mythical stories. A male head with lionskin cap found here may be associated with Telephos, promoting the association between this local hero and Heracles. His fight with Achilles puts him on par with this brave Trojan War hero, once more emphasising Tegea's local heroes on a Panhellenic level through the iconography at this temple.

Also the interior of the temple was described by Pausanias, who refers to a combination of myths of local significance. He begins by mentioning the present image of Athena at Tegea, which he states was from the district of the Manthurenses; among them she had surname of Hippia (Horse Goddess). The Manthurenses claimed that during the battle between the gods and giants the goddess drove her chariot and horses against Enkelados. Pausanias then further claims that said goddess became known as Alea amongst the Greeks, highlighting especially the Peloponnesians.

=== Cult and icons in the temple ===
In addition to the cult of Athena within the temple, there was a statue of the healing god Asclepius on one side of the cult image of Athena, and on the other side, a statue of Hygieia, goddess of health and cleanliness, both further works of Skopas of Paros.

Pausanias says that according to the local tradition, the altar of Athena Alea was made by the mythical hero Melampus, the son of Amythaon. On the altar itself there was on one side representations of Rhea, the local nymph Oinoe, who was the nurse of Zeus and the mother of Pan in Tegean traditions. On the other was another four mythical characters Glauke, Neda, Theisoa and Anthrakia; another side included Ide, Hagno, Alkinoe and Phrixa. Finally, there were iconographical representations of the Muses and of Mnemosyne, goddess of memory.

In addition to cult images, there were several representations of key local heroic characters such as Thelephos and Atlanta, but also the shield of Marpessa, who rallied the women of Tegea to defence of the city against the Spartans, leading to the foundation of the cult of Ares Gynaecothoenas in Tegean territory.

There were two festivals celebrated at the sanctuary; the Aleaia and the Halotia, the first celebration of Alea, and the latter in celebration of a victory over the Spartans.

Pausanias also states that the priest of the temple of Athena Alea at Tegea was a boy, who held office only until reaching the age of puberty.

=== Excavations ===
The archaeological site has a long history of archaeological exploration, dating back to 1806 when the Irish painter and author Edward Dodwell found the temple using the work of Pausanias. Even with the temple being recognised by this time, it would take several decades before the first excavations of the site, which first took place in the 1870s; this first excavation was done by a German team and their results were published in Mitteilungen des Archäologisches Institutes in Athen in 1880. After the Germans, the site was taken over by the French, who had led some excavating missions to Tegea in the early 1900s. Similarly, Greek teams excavated the sanctuary in 1908 and in 1976–1977.

Since the 1990s the site has been under the control of the Norwegian Institute at Athens, after the Norwegian archaeologist Erik Østby discovered the remains of the earlier sanctuary, which had been proposed to be an Early Christian or Byzantine church in the French publications of the site. Since then the Norwegian teams have led excavations at the sanctuary (the last one to date finished in 2004), as well as in the larger territory of the ancient city of Tegea.

== Bibliography ==
Dodwell, E. (1819) A Classical and Topographical Tour through Greece, during the years 1801, 1805 and 1806., 2 vols. (II; London: Thomas Davidson).

Dugas, C.(1921), 'Le sanctuaire d'Aléa Athéna à Tégée avant le IVe siècle', Bulletin de Correspondance Hellénique, 45, 335-435.

Larson, J. (2001) Greek Nymphs: Myth, Cult, Lore, Oxford: Oxford University Press.

Leger, R. (2015) Artemis and Her Cult, PhD Thesis: The University of Birmingham.

McInerney, J. (2013) "The Gods of (Con)fusion: Athena Alea, Apollo Maleatas and Athena Aphaia." Classica et Mediaevalia, 64, 49-80.

Mendel, G. (1901), 'Fouilles de Tégée: rapport sommaire sur la campagne de 1900-1901', Bulletin de Correspondance Hellénique, 25, 241-81.

Meyer, H. (1824) Geschichte der bildenden Künste bei den Griechen: von ihrem Ursprunge bis zum höchsten Flor, Dresden: Whalter.

Milchhӧfer, A. (1880), 'Untersuchungsausgrabungen in Tegea', Mitteilungen des Archäologischen Institutes in Athen, 5, 52-69, Plate II-IV.

Mostratos, G. (2019) "The Manipulation of Panhellenic and Local Myth in the Pedimental Compostions of the Century Pelonnesian Temples", in E. Koulakiotis and C. Dunn. (eds.) Political Religion in the Greco-Roman World: Discourses, Practives and Images, Cambridge Scholars Publishing: Newcastle, 225-263.

Norman, N. (1986) "Asklepios and Hygieia and the Cult Statue at Tegea", American Journal of Archaeology, 90.4, 425-430.

Østby, E. (2010) "Early Tegea, Sparta, and the Sanctuary of Athena Alea", in Being Peloponnesian, https://www.nottingham.ac.uk/csps/resources/peloponnese-2007.aspx

Østby, E. (2014a) "The Norwegian Excavation Project in the Sanctuary of Athena Alea at Tegea: An Introduction", in E. Østby (ed.). Tegea I: Investigations in the Temple of Athena Alea 1991-94, Athens: The Norwegian Institute at Athens, 1-10.

Østby, E. (2014b) "The sanctuary of Alea at Tegea in the pre-Classical period" in E. Østby (ed.). Tegea I: Investigations in the Temple of Athena Alea 1991-94, Athens: The Norwegian Institute at Athens, 10-56.

Pretzler, M. (1999) "Myth and History at Tegea - Local History and Community Identity", in T.H. Nielsen and J. Roy. (eds.) Defining Ancient Arcadia, Munksgaard: Copenhagen, 89-129.

Pretzler, M. (2008). "Tegea and its Neighbours in the Archaic Period." In Y. A.. Pikoulas (ed.), Ιστορίες για την αρχαία Αρκαδία. Athens: Stemnitsa: 145-162.

Rhomaios, K. (1909), ''Eργασίαι ἐν Τεγέα', Praktika, 303-16.

Voyatzis, M. (1999) "The Role of Temple Building in Consolidating Arkadian Communities", in T.H. Nielsen and J. Roy. (eds.) Defining Ancient Arcadia, Munksgaard: Copenhagen, 130-168.
