= Auge (mythology) =

Greek goddess

In Greek mythology, Auge (/ˈɔːdʒiː/; Ancient Greek: Αὐγή, romanized: Augê, lit. 'sunbeam, daylight, dawn'; Modern Greek: "av-YEE"), may refer to two distinct characters:

- Auge, one of the twelve Horae (Hours).
- Auge, daughter of King Aleus of Arcadia and mother of Telephus by Heracles.
