= Regions of ancient Greece =

Geographical sub-divisions of the Hellenic world

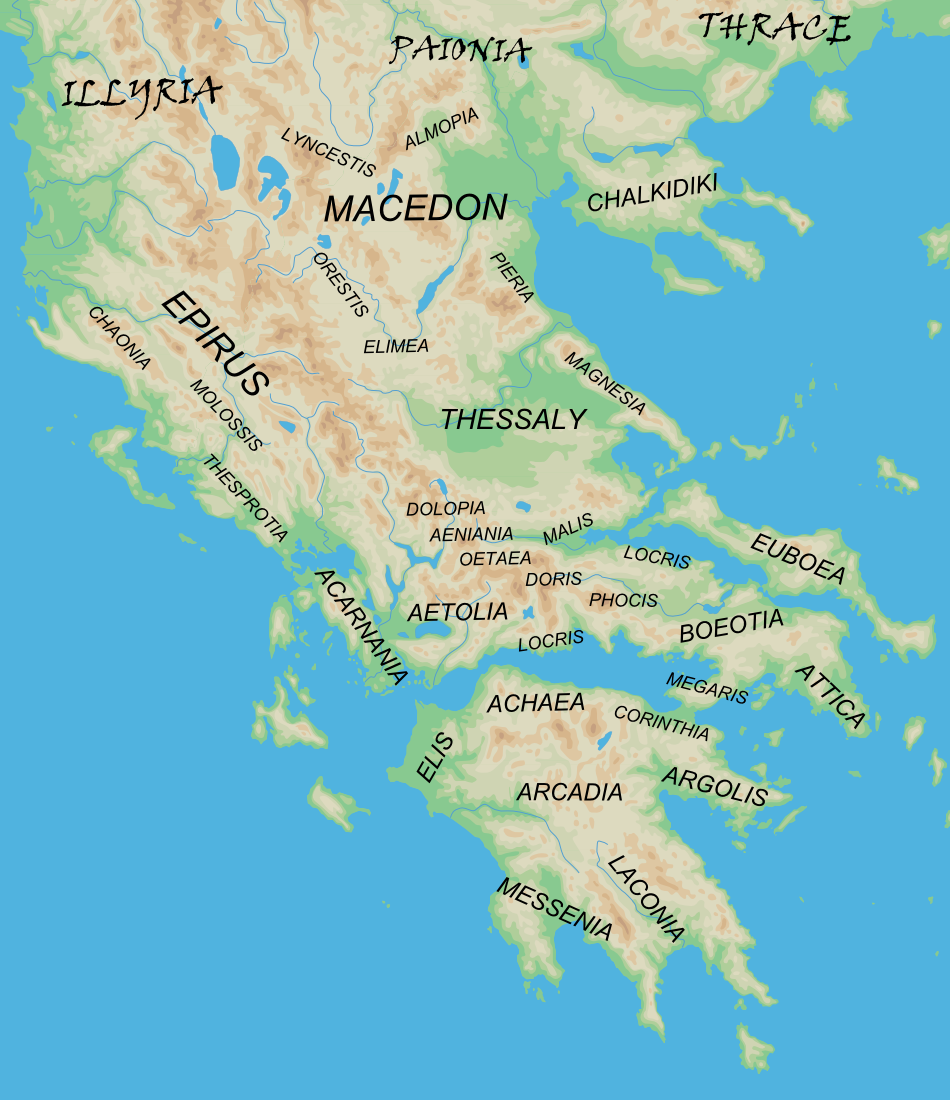
Map showing the major regions of mainland ancient Greece, and adjacent "barbarian" lands

The regions of ancient Greece were sub-divisions of the Hellenic world as conceived by the ancient Greeks, shown by their presence in the works of ancient historians and geographers or in surviving legends and myths.

Conceptually, there is no clear theme to the structure of these regions. Some, particularly in the Peloponnese, can be seen primarily as distinct geo-physical units, defined by physical boundaries such as mountain ranges and rivers. Conversely, the division of central Greece between Boeotia, Phocis, Doris and the three parts of Locris, seems to be attributable to ancient tribal divisions and not major geographical features. Both types of regions retained their identity throughout the Greek Dark Ages and its tumultuous changes in the local population and culture, giving them a less political and more symbolic presence.

Other geographical divisions not identified with the aforementioned areas did, however, change over time, suggesting a closer connection with tribal identity. Regardless of their rates of fluctuation, all such regions would eventually take on geo-political meanings, with regional political bodies like the Arcadian League commonly unifying its poleis under a confederation (see symmachia) in the Classical period.

These traditional sub-divisions of Greece form the basis for the modern system of regional units of Greece. However, there are important differences, with many of the smaller ancient regions not represented in the current system.

== Central Greece ==
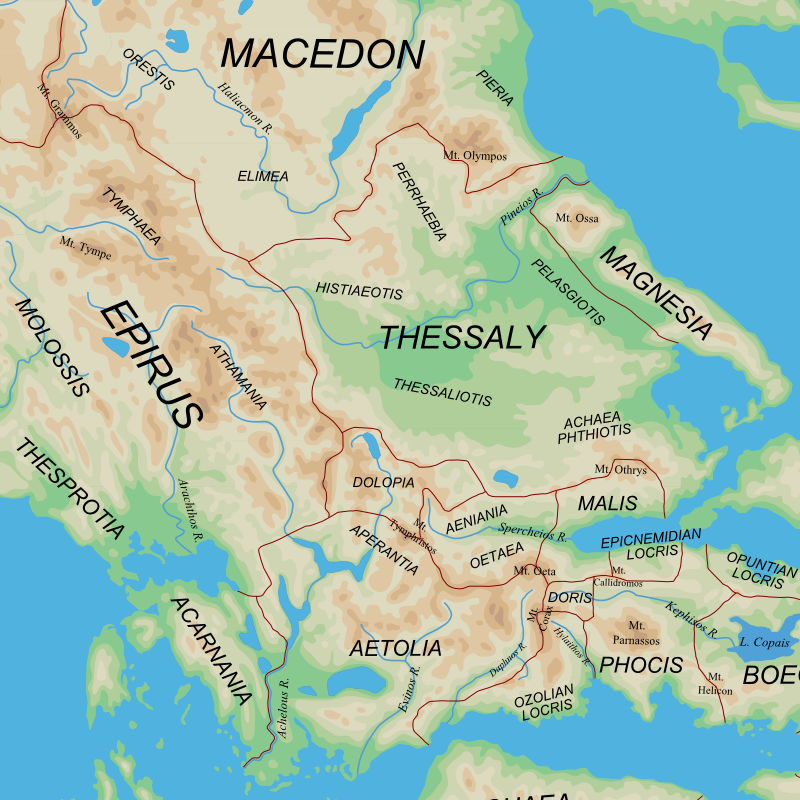
Ancient Regions of West Central, North and West Greece

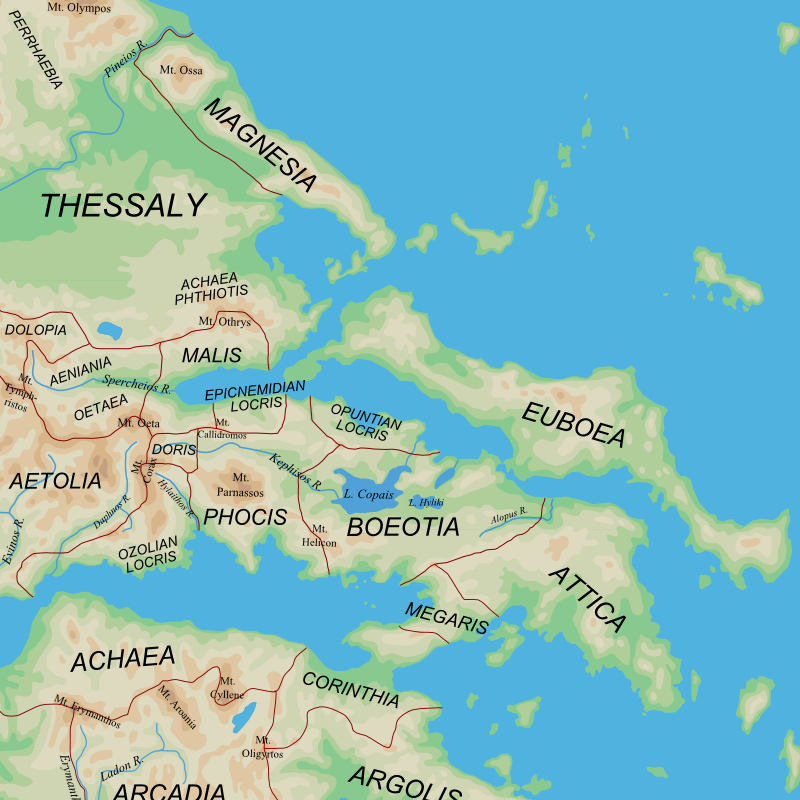
Ancient regions of Central Greece

Continental Greece (Greek: Στερεά Ελλάδα or Χέρσος Ἑλλάς) was (and still is) a geographic region of Greece. In English the area is usually called Central Greece, but the equivalent Greek term (Κεντρική Ελλάδα, Kentrikí Elláda) is more rarely used.

=== Acarnania ===
Acarnania (Greek: Ἀκαρνανία) is a region of west-central Greece that lies along the Ionian Sea, west of Aetolia, with the Achelous River for a boundary, and north of the gulf of Calydon, which is the entrance to the Gulf of Corinth. Today it forms the western part of the regional unit of Aetolia-Acarnania. The capital and principal city in ancient times was Stratos. The north side of Acarnania of the Corinthian Gulf was considered part of the region of Epirus.

Acarnania's foundation in Greek mythology was traditionally ascribed to Acarnan, son of Alcmaeon.

=== Aeniania ===
Aeniania (Greek: Αἰνιανία) or Ainis (Greek: Αἰνίς) was a small district to the south of Thessaly (which it was sometimes considered part of). The regions of Aeniania and Oetaea were closely linked, both occupying the valley of the Spercheios river, with Aeniania occupying the lower ground to the north, and Oetaea the higher ground south of the river. The boundaries of these two regions were formed by the arc of high ground running west from Mount Oeta round to Mount Tymphristos, then north round to the headwaters of Spercheios, and then east to the western spur of Mount Othrys. The lowland border in the Spercheios valley with Malis ran approximately north-south along from Oeta to the western spur of Othrys.

During the Archaic and Classical periods, the Aenianians (in Greek Αἰνιᾶνες) were members of the Delphian Amphictyonic League, and shared two votes on the Amphictyonic council with the Oetaeans.

=== Aetolia ===
The Achelous River separates Aetolia (Greek: Αἰτωλία) from Acarnania to the west; on the north it had boundaries with Epirus and Thessaly; on the east with the Ozolian Locrians; and on the south the entrance to the Corinthian Gulf defined the limits of Aetolia. In classical times Aetolia comprised two parts: Old Aetolia in the west, from the Achelous to the Evenus and Calydon; and New Aetolia or Acquired Aetolia in the east, from the Evenus and Calydon to the Ozolian Locrians. The country has a level and fruitful coastal region, but an unproductive and mountainous interior. The mountains contained many wild beasts, and acquired fame in Greek mythology as the scene of the hunt for the Calydonian Boar.

=== Aperantia ===
Ancient Aperantia (Greek: Ἀπεραντία) was a small region of Aetolia, south of Dolopia. Its inhabitants were known as Aperantii.

=== Attica ===
The name of Attica (Greek: Ἀττική) was said to be derived from Atthis, daughter of Cranaus, who was said to have been the second king of Athens. The origin of the name, however, is most likely pre-Greek in origin. Attica is bounded on the east by the Aegean sea, on the west by Megaris and the Saronic gulf and on the north by Boeotia. It is separated from Boeotia by two mountain ranges, Parnes and Cithaeron. In the Archaic and Classical periods, the Atticans were members of the Delphian Amphictyonic League, and shared the two Ionian votes on the Amphictyonic council with the Euboeans.

=== Boeotia ===
The region of Boeotia (Greek: Βοιωτία), along with many of the cities that existed there in the Classical period, is described in the "catalogue of ships", in the Iliad. In the Archaic and Classical periods, the Boeotians were members of the Delphian Amphictyonic League, and had two votes on the Amphictyonic council.

=== Dolopia ===
Dolopia (Greek: Δολοπία) was a mountainous region of Greece, located north of Aetolia. The Dolopians were members of the Delphian Amphictyonic League, and shared two votes on the Amphictyonic council with the Perrhaeboi.

=== Doris ===
In the Archaic and Classical periods, the Dorians (Greek: Δωριείς; region: Δωρίς) were members of the Delphian Amphictyonic League, and shared the two Dorian votes on the Amphictyonic council with the Laconian Dorians.

=== Euboea ===
In the Archaic and Classical periods, the Euboeans were members of the Delphian Amphictyonic League, and shared the two Ionian votes on the Amphictyonic council with the Athenians.

=== Locris ===
The region of Locris, primarily the eastern part ("that dwell over against sacred Euboea"), is described in the Iliad. In the Archaic and Classical periods, the Locrians were members of the Delphian Amphictyonic League, and had two votes on the Amphictyonic council.

=== Malis ===
In the Archaic and Classical periods, the Malians were members of the Delphian Amphictyonic League, and had two votes on the Amphictyonic council.

=== Megaris ===
Megaris (Ancient Greek: Μεγαρίς) was a small but populous state and region of ancient Greece, west of Attica and north of Corinthia, whose inhabitants were adventurous seafarers, credited with deceitful propensities. The capital, Megara, famous for white marble and fine clay, was the birthplace of the eponymous Euclid. Mount Geraneia dominates the center of the region.

=== Oetaea ===
Oetaea (Greek: Οἰταία) was a small upland district located south of Thessaly (of which it was sometimes considered part). It was closely linked with the district of Aeniania, sharing a location in the valley of the Spercheios (see above). The Oetaeans were members of the Delphian Amphictyonic League, and shared two votes on the Amphictyonic council with the Aenianes.

=== Phocis ===
The region of Phocis, along with some of the cities that existed there in the Classical period, is described in the Iliad. In the Archaic and Classical periods, the Phocians were members of the Delphian Amphictyonic League, and had two votes on the Amphictyonic council, until they were stripped of them after the Third Sacred War.

== Peloponnese ==
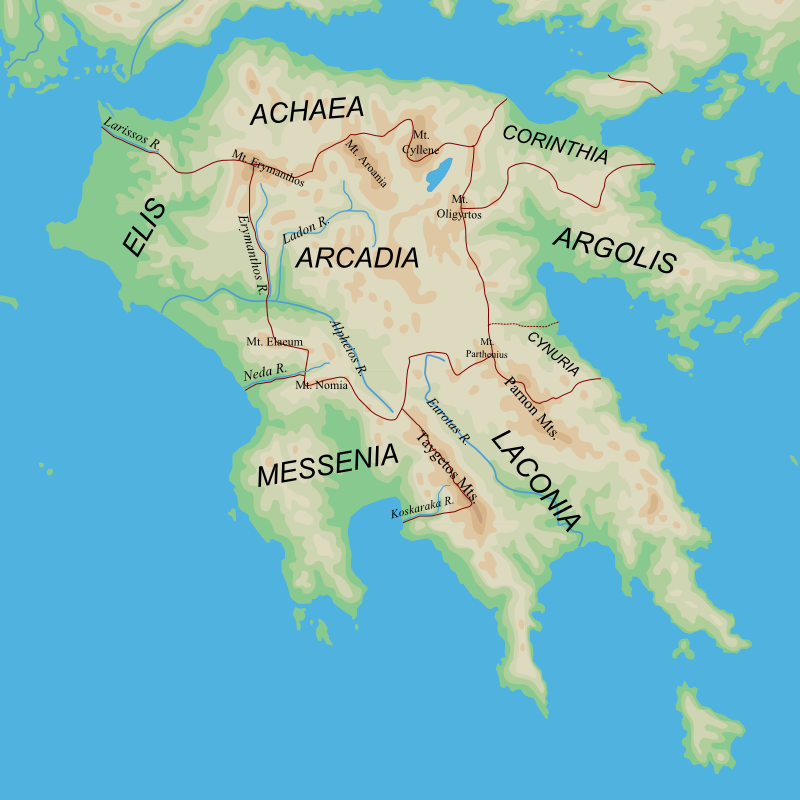
Ancient Regions of Peloponnese (southern mainland Greece)

The Peloponnese or Peloponnesos, is a large peninsula at the southern tip of the Balkans, and part of the traditional heartland of Greece. It is joined to the Greek 'mainland' by the Isthmus of Corinth. The Peloponnese is conventionally divided into seven regions, which remain in use as regional units of modern Greece. Most of these regions are directly named in the "catalogue of ships" in the Iliad, suggesting that this geographic division of the Peloponnese is very ancient, and stretches back to Mycenaean Greece.

=== Achaea ===
Geographically, Achaea was (and is) the northernmost region of the Peloponnese, occupying the coastal strip north of Arcadia. To the south, it bordered Arcadia along the ridge of high ground running from Mount Erymanthos to Mount Cyllene. To the east, it bordered Corinthia near to the city of Sicyon, and to the west the Larissos river and western ridge of Erymanthos formed the border with Elis. Apart from the plain around Dyme, to the west, Achaea was generally a mountainous region.

=== Arcadia ===
Geographically, ancient Arcadia occupied the highlands at the centre of the Peloponnese. To the north, it bordered Achaea along the ridge of high ground running from Mount Erymanthos to Mount Cyllene; most of Mount Aroania lay within Arcadia. To the east, it had borders with Argolis and Corinthia along the ridge of high ground running from Mount Cyllene round to Mount Oligyrtus and then south Mount Parthenius. To the south, the border Laconia and Messenia ran through the foothills of the Parnon and Taygetos mountain ranges, such that Arcadia contained all the headwaters of the Alpheios river, but none of the Eurotas river. To the south-west, the border with Messania ran along the tops of Mount Nomia, and Mount Elaeum, and from there the border with Elis ran along the valleys of the Erymanthos and Diagon rivers. Most of the region of Arcardia was mountainous, apart from the plains around Tegea and Megalopolis, and the valleys of the Alpheios and Ladon rivers.

Due to its remote, mountainous character, Arcadia seems to have been a cultural refuge. When, during the Greek Dark Age, Doric Greek dialects were introduced to the Peloponnese, the older language apparently survived in Arcadia, and formed part of the Arcado-Cypriot group of Greek languages. Herodotus says that the inhabitants of Arcadia were Pelasgians, the Greek name for the supposed 'indigenous' inhabitants of Greece, who dwelt there before the arrival of the 'Hellenic' tribes. Whilst Herodotus seems to have found the idea that the Pelasgians were not 'Greek' far-fetched, it is clear that the Arcadians were considered as the original inhabitants of the region.

Arcadia is one of the regions described in the "catalogue of ships" in the Iliad. Agamemnon himself gave Arcadia the ships for the Trojan war because Arcadia did not have a navy.

There is a modern regional unit of Greece of the same name, which is more extensive than the ancient region.

=== Argolis ===
Ancient Argolis, sometimes called 'the Argolid' and taking its name from the city of Argos, occupied the eastern part of the Peloponnesus, primarily the Argolid peninsula, together with the coastal region to the east of Arcadia, and north of Laconia. To the north, the boundary with the territory of Corinth was rather more fluid, and these territories have sometimes been considered together. For instance, Pausanias discussed Argolis and Corinthia together in one book of his Description of Greece; similarly, in modern Greece, a prefecture of "Argolidocorinthia" has existed at various times.

Argolis is discussed in the "catalogue of ships" of the Iliad, without being given that explicit name, but the major cities of the region are listed together under the leadership of Diomedes. There is a modern regional unit of Greece of the same name, occupying a smaller area than the ancient region.

The Pyramids of Argolis are found within this territory.

=== Corinthia ===
The territory associated with the city of ancient Corinth in ancient Greece lay on either side of the isthmus of Corinth. On the northern side of the Isthmus, it was bounded by Mount Geraneia, which separated it from Megaris. On the Peloponnesian side of the Isthmus, Corinthia was bounded by Achaea to the west, and to the south by the territory of Argolis. As discussed above, the boundary between Argolis and Corinthia was rather fluid, and in both ancient and modern times, the regions have been considered together.

Corinthia is discussed in the "catalogue of ships" of the Iliad, without being given that explicit name, but the major cities of the region are listed together under the leadership of Agamemnon. There is a modern regional unit of Greece of the same name.

=== Elis ===
Elis occupied the western, and flattest part of the Peloponnese. To the north-east, it bordered Achaea along the Larissos river and western spur of Erymanthos, and the east the border with Arcadia ran along the Erymanthos and Diagon rivers to Mount Elaeum. From the Elaeum, its border with Messenia ran along the Neda river to the sea.

Elis is discussed in the "catalogue of ships" of the Iliad, without being given that explicit name (Elis is only used for the name of the city), but the major cities of the region are listed together. There is a modern regional unit of Greece with the same name.

=== Laconia ===
Laconia (also called Lacedaemon; Greek: Λακεδαίμων, Lakedaimōn), occupied the south-eastern part of the Peloponnese. Its principal boundaries were formed by the Parnon and Taygetos mountain ranges. Its western boundary, adjoining Messenia, ran along the Koskaraka (or Rema Mili) River from just south of the city of Abia, up into the Taygetos range, and then north along the Taygetos ridge. The northern border with Arcadia ran amongst the foothills of Taygetos and Parnon, such that up Laconia included all the headwaters of the Eurotas river. To the north-east of the Parnon range was the coastal area of Cynuria; this was originally part of the Argolid, but by the Classical period had become part of Laconia. The land between the Taygetos and Parnon ranges formed the heart of Laconia; the coastal region east of Parnon, and south of Cynuria was also part of Laconia. Lacedaemon is one of the regions described in the "catalogue of ships" in the Iliad.

In the Archaic and Classical periods, the Laconians were members of the Delphian Amphictyonic League, and shared the two Dorian votes on the Amphictyonic council with the Dorians from Doris. There is a modern regional unit of Greece of the same name.

During the Classical period, Laconia was dominated by the city of Sparta. There were other settlements in the region, and most inhabitants were not full Spartan citizens (Spartiates), but Lacedaemonians or Perioeci ("about-dwellers"). However, all these citizens and towns were part of the Spartan state. Only after the final eclipse of Spartan power after the War against Nabis did the rest of Laconia become free from Spartan domination. However, Laconia instead fell under the domination of the Achaean League until the whole of the Peloponnese was conquered by the Romans in 146 BC.

=== Messenia ===
Messenia occupied the south-western part of the Peloponnese. To the north it had a border with Elis along the Neda river, from whence the border with Arcadia ran along the tops of Mount Elaeum and Mount Nomia. The northern border with Arcadia then ran amongst the foothills of Taygetos, but all the headwater of the Alpheios river lay outside Messenia. The eastern border with Laconia ran along the Taygetos ridge up to the Koskaraka river, and then along that river to the sea, near the city of Abia.

There is a modern regional unit of Greece of the same name.

== Thessaly ==
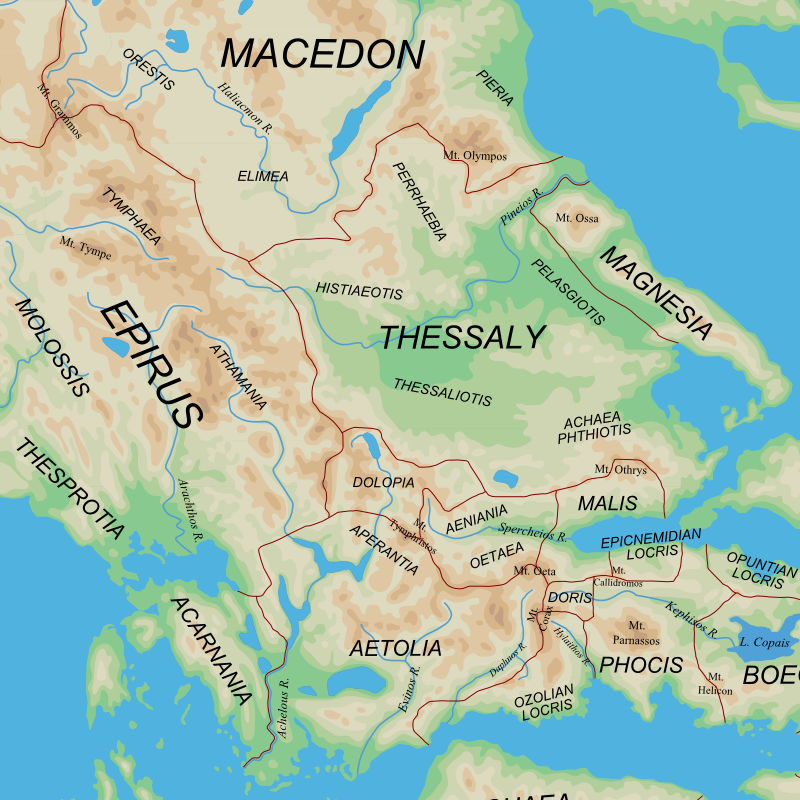
Ancient Regions West Central, North and West Greece

Thessaly was one of the traditional regions of Ancient Greece. During the Mycenaean period, Thessaly was known as Aeolia, a name that continued to be used for one of the major tribes of Greece, the Aeolians, and their dialect of Greek, Aeolic.

=== Achaea Phthiotis ===
The Phtiotic Achaeans were members of the Delphian Amphictyonic League, and had two votes on the Amphictyonic council.

=== Magnesia ===
The Magnetes were members of the Delphian Amphictyonic League, and had two votes on the Amphictyonic council.

=== Perrhaebia ===
Perrhaebia was the northernmost district of ancient Thessaly, where the tribe of Perrhaebi lived. Major cities were: Pythion, Doliche, Azorus, Oloosson and Phalanna the capital. Perrhaebia was part of Macedonia between 4th and 1st centuries BC.

== Epirus ==
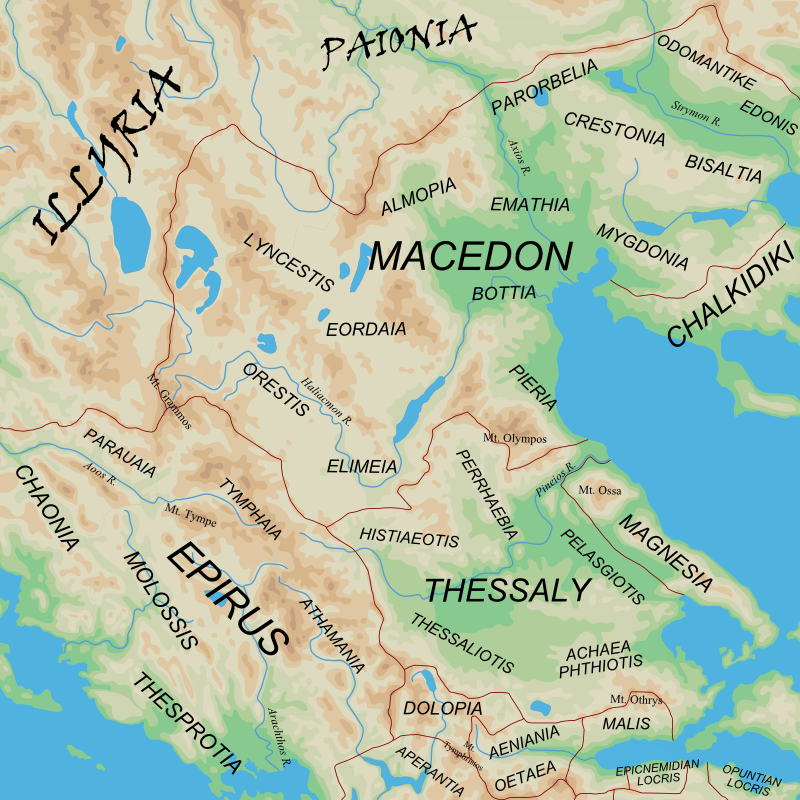
Map showing the regions of ancient Epirus and Macedon

=== Athamania ===
Athamania (Greek: Ἀθαμάνες) referred to the southeastern area of Epirus, which was the homeland of the Greek tribe of the Athamanians, who are usually considered to be Greek by modern scholars, although Strabo and Hecataeus of Miletus considered them "barbarians." The former Greek municipality of the same name is named after the ancient territory.

=== Chaonia ===
Chaonia or Chaon (Greek Χαονία or Χάων) was the name of the northwestern part of Epirus, the homeland of the Greek tribe of the Chaonians. Its main town was called Phoenice. According to Virgil, Chaon was the eponymous ancestor of the Chaonians.

=== Molossis ===
The Molossians (Greek: Μολοσσοί, romanized: Molossoi) were an ancient Greek tribal state that inhabited the region of Epirus since the Mycenaean era. On their northeast frontier, they had the Chaonians and on their southern frontier the kingdom of the Thesprotians; to their north were the Illyrians.

=== Parauaea ===
Parauaea (Greek: Παραυαία) was an ancient Greek region in Epirus.

== Macedonia ==
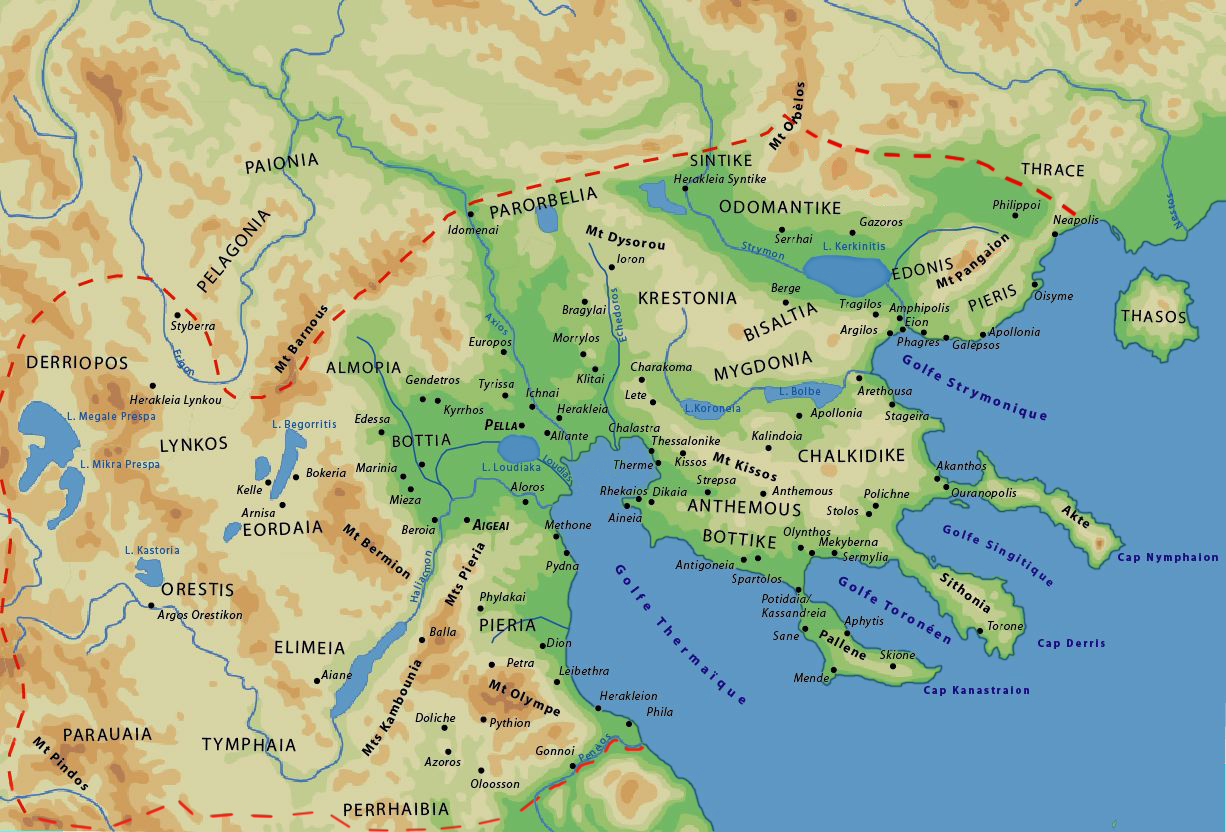
Ancient Regions of Macedonia

Macedonia or Macedon (from Greek: Μακεδονία, Makedonía) was an ancient kingdom and region, centered in the northeastern part of the Greek peninsula, bordered by Epirus to the west, Paionia to the north, Thrace to the east and Thessaly to the south. Early geographers put river Strimon as the eastern border of Macedonia with Thrace. However, as kingdom of Macedon was expanding and was pushing east the Thracian tribes, river Nestos was regarded as the eastern border of the region and Sintice, Odomantis and Edonis were included in it.

=== Edonis ===
Traditionally part of Thrace but after its annexation by the kingdom of Macedon it was regarded as part of the region of Macedonia.

=== Odomantis ===
Traditionally part of Thrace but after its annexation by the kingdom of Macedon it was regarded as part of the region of Macedonia.

=== Sintice ===
Traditionally part of Thrace but after its annexation by the kingdom of Macedon it was regarded as part of the region of Macedonia.

== Greek colonies ==
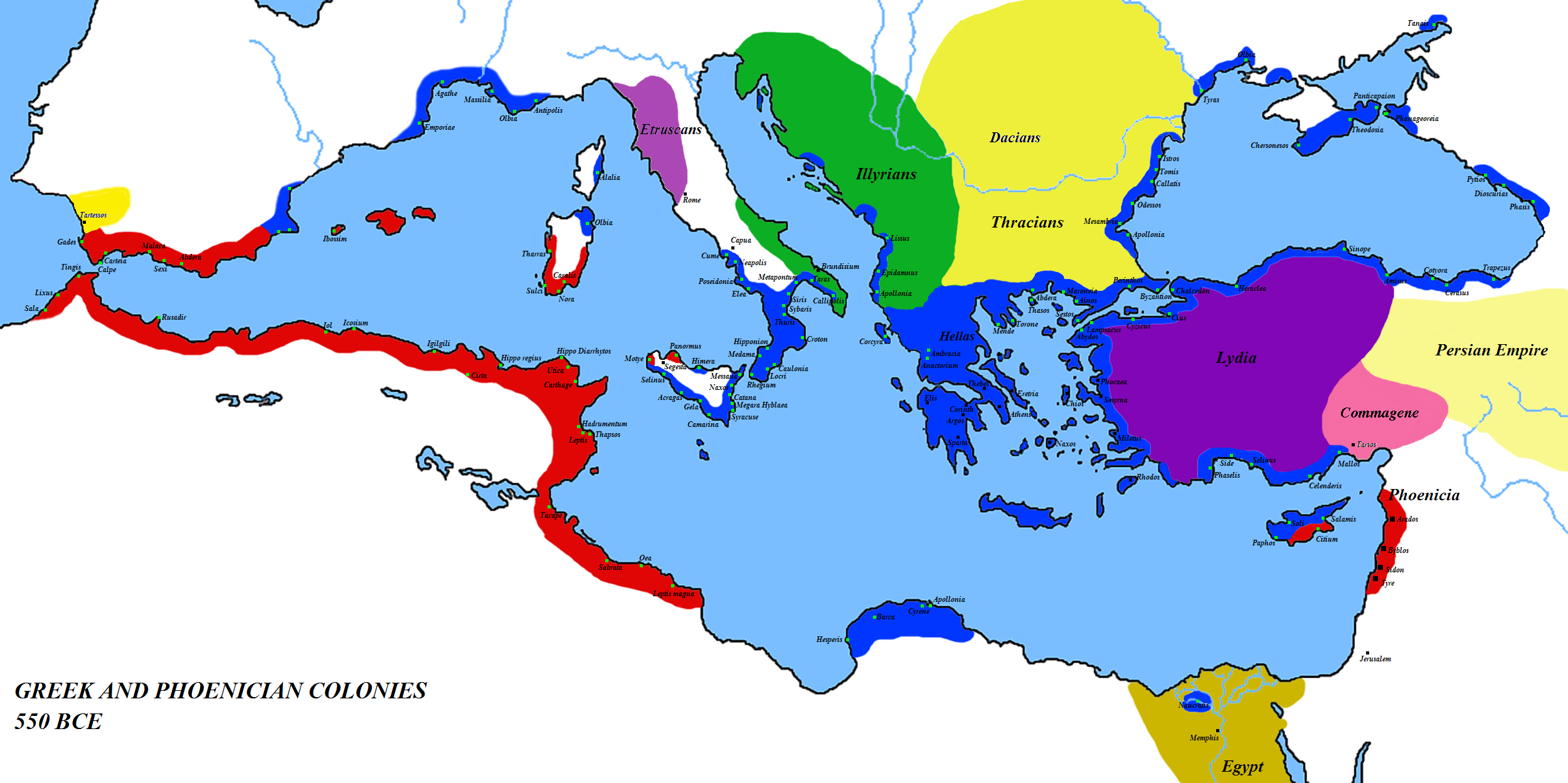
Greek colonies (blue) at about 550 BC

Ancient Greek colonies of the Black Sea, 8th–3rd century BC

Magna Graecia (Μεγάλη Ἑλλάς – Megálē Hellás) ancient colonies and dialects in the Classical Age (before Roman conquest)

=== Magna Graecia ===
Magna Graecia were the Greek colonies founded on the Italian peninsula that includes Syracuse, Taras (Tarentum), Neapolis, etc.

=== Asia Minor ===
Asia Minor (Anatolia) was at the forefront of Greek colonization.

== See also ==
List of ancient Greek cities
