= Endoeus =

Ancient Greek sculptor

Endoeus or Endoios (Greek: Ἔνδοιος) was an ancient Greek sculptor who worked at Athens in the middle of the 6th century BC. Endoeus made an image of Athena dedicated by Callias (the contemporary of Pisistratus) at Athens about 564 BC. An inscription bearing his name has been found at Athens, written in Ionic dialect. The tradition which made him a pupil of Daedalus is apparently misleading, since Daedalus had no connection with Ionic art.

He was also known to have crafted an ivory Athena Alea, which was in the temple of that goddess in Tegea until it was taken by Augustus to Rome to adorn the Forum of Augustus.
