= Ares Gynaecothoenas =

Epithet of the god Ares

Gynaecothoenas (Greek: Γυναικοθήνας, lit. 'the god feasted by women') was an epithet of the Ancient Greek war god Ares in the ancient city of Tegea in Arcadia. According to the tradition found in the account of Pausanias, during a war between the Tegeans and the Spartans, the women of Tegea defended the city from an invasion led by the Spartan king Charilaus. The women were led by Marpessa and, after arming themselves, defeated the Spartans following an ambush. Among the prisoners was the Spartan king himself. Gynaecothoenas as an epithet of Ares arose following these events; Pausanias states that it was these events that led to the new epithet and a feast of Ares in which only women partook.

Pausanias, in his account, does not mention the direct involvement of the war god in these events, showing how these events were led by the initiative of the local women without divine interference. It was then the women who offered the sacrifice to Ares following the events.

Marpessa's weapon was later in plain sight in the Temple of Athena Alea, a focal point for the local population in Tegea, showing the importance of this story and the character of Marpessa in the collective memory of the Tegeans. The image of Ares Gynaecothoenas was located on the Tegean Agora and was, as such, also easily viewable for visitors to the city. This story is a part of the narrative of conflict between the Tegeans and the Spartans, which makes up some of the putative history that featured as an important part of local identity in Tegea.

== Bibliography ==
Durcey, P. (2015) "War in the Feminine in Ancient Greece". In J. Fabre-Serries and A. Keith. eds. Women in War in Antiquity, Johns Hopkins University Press: Baltimore, 181-199.

Georgoudi, S. (2015) "To Act, Not Submit: Women's Attitudes in Situations of War in Ancient Greece". In J. Fabre-Serries and A. Keith. eds. Women in War in Antiquity, Johns Hopkins University Press: Baltimore, 200-2013.

Pretzler, M. (1999) "Myth and History at Tegea - Local tradition and community identity." In T.H. Nielsen and J. Roy. eds. Defining Ancient Arkadia, Munksgaard: Copenhagen, 89-129.
