= Alea, Argolis =

Village in the Peloponnese, Greece

Alea Αλέα
- Municipal unit
- Location within the regional unit

- Location within Greece
- Coordinates: 37°45′N 22°26′E
- Country: Greece
- Administrative region: Peloponnese
- Regional unit: Argolis
- Municipality: Argos-Mykines

Area
  - Municipal unit: 143.2 km^{2} (55.3 sq mi)

Population (2021)
  - Municipal unit: 439
  - Municipal unit density: 3.07/km^{2} (7.94/sq mi)
  - Community: 65
- Time zone: UTC+2 (EET)
  - Summer (DST): UTC+3 (EEST)
- Vehicle registration: AP

Alea (Greek: Αλέα, before 1928: Μπουγιάτι – Bougiati) is a village and a former community in Argolis, Peloponnese, Greece. Since the 2011 local government reform it is part of the municipality Argos-Mykines, of which it is a municipal unit. The municipal unit has an area of 143.206 km^{2}. The seat of the community was Skoteini. Alea is situated in the mountainous northwestern part of Argolis, 5 km southeast of Kandila, 12 km northwest of Lyrkeia, 14 km northeast of Levidi and 27 km north of Tripoli. The Greek National Road 66 (Levidi – Nemea) passes near Skoteini.

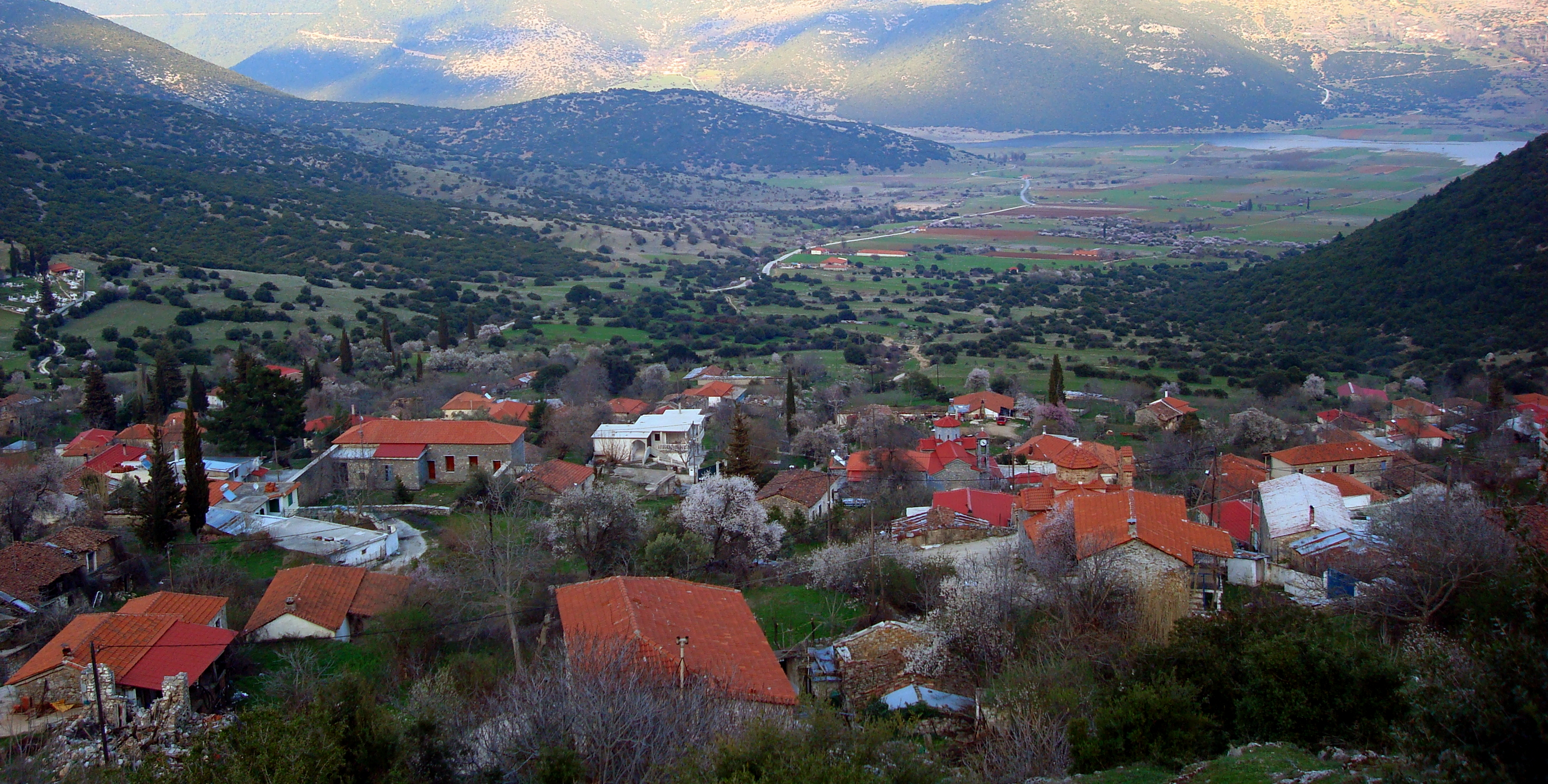
Village Alea. Note: The floods in the valley plateau are drained by a katavothra (Greek term for ponor)

== Subdivisions ==
The municipal unit Alea is subdivided into the following communities (constituent villages in brackets):

- Agios Nikolaos (Agios Nikolaos, Exochi, Platani)
- Alea
- Frousiouna
- Skoteini

== Population ==
| Year | Community population | Municipal unit population |
|---|---|---|
| 1981 | 170 | – |
| 1991 | 115 | 809 |
| 2001 | 146 | 793 |
| 2011 | 103 | 660 |
| 2021 | 65 | 439 |

== History ==
Alea was an ancient city of Arcadia, founded by the mythical king Aleus, a son of Apheidas. It was situated near Stymphalos. The city had temples of Artemis of Ephesus, Athena Alea and Dionysus. Every other year the Skiereia, a celebration for the god Dionysus, were celebrated. Traces of ancient buildings have been found near the modern village.

== See also ==
- List of settlements in Argolis
