= Kandila, Arcadia =

Kandila Κανδήλα
- Community
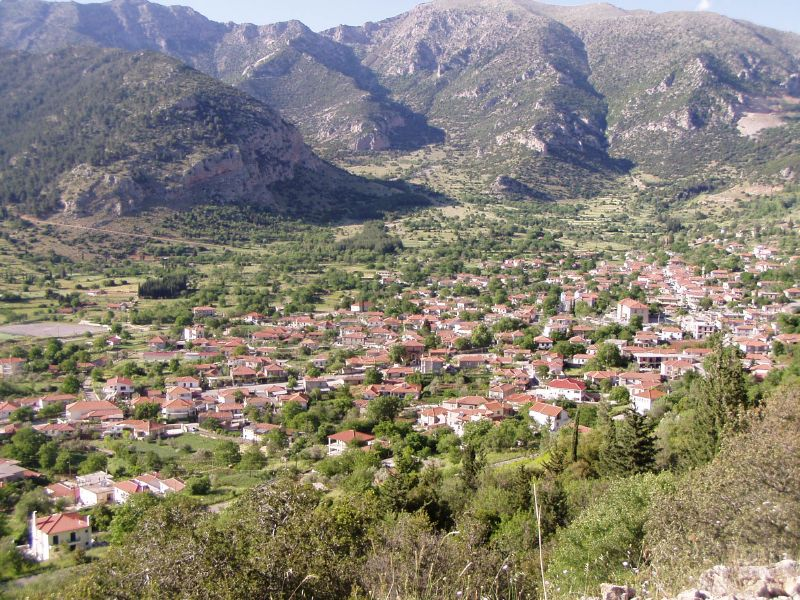

- Location within Greece
- Coordinates: 37°46′N 22°23′E
- Country: Greece
- Administrative region: Peloponnese
- Regional unit: Arcadia
- Municipality: Tripoli
- Municipal unit: Levidi

Population (2021)
  - Community: 559
- Time zone: UTC+2 (EET)
  - Summer (DST): UTC+3 (EEST)
- Vehicle registration: TP

Kandila (Greek: Κανδήλα) is a village and a community in the municipal unit of Levidi, Arcadia, Greece. It is situated on the southern slope of the Oligyrtos mountain, at about 800 m elevation. The community includes the village Diakopi. Kandila is near the tripoint of Arcadia, Corinthia and Argolis. It is 5 km southwest of Skoteini (Argolis), 12 km northeast of Levidi and 29 km north of Tripoli. The Greek National Road 66 (Levidi – Nemea) passes through the village.

The village is not visible from far away, with the exception of the Monastery of Virgin Mary, which is built inside a large rock, on the side of the mountain and can be seen as you enter the plateau.

== Population ==
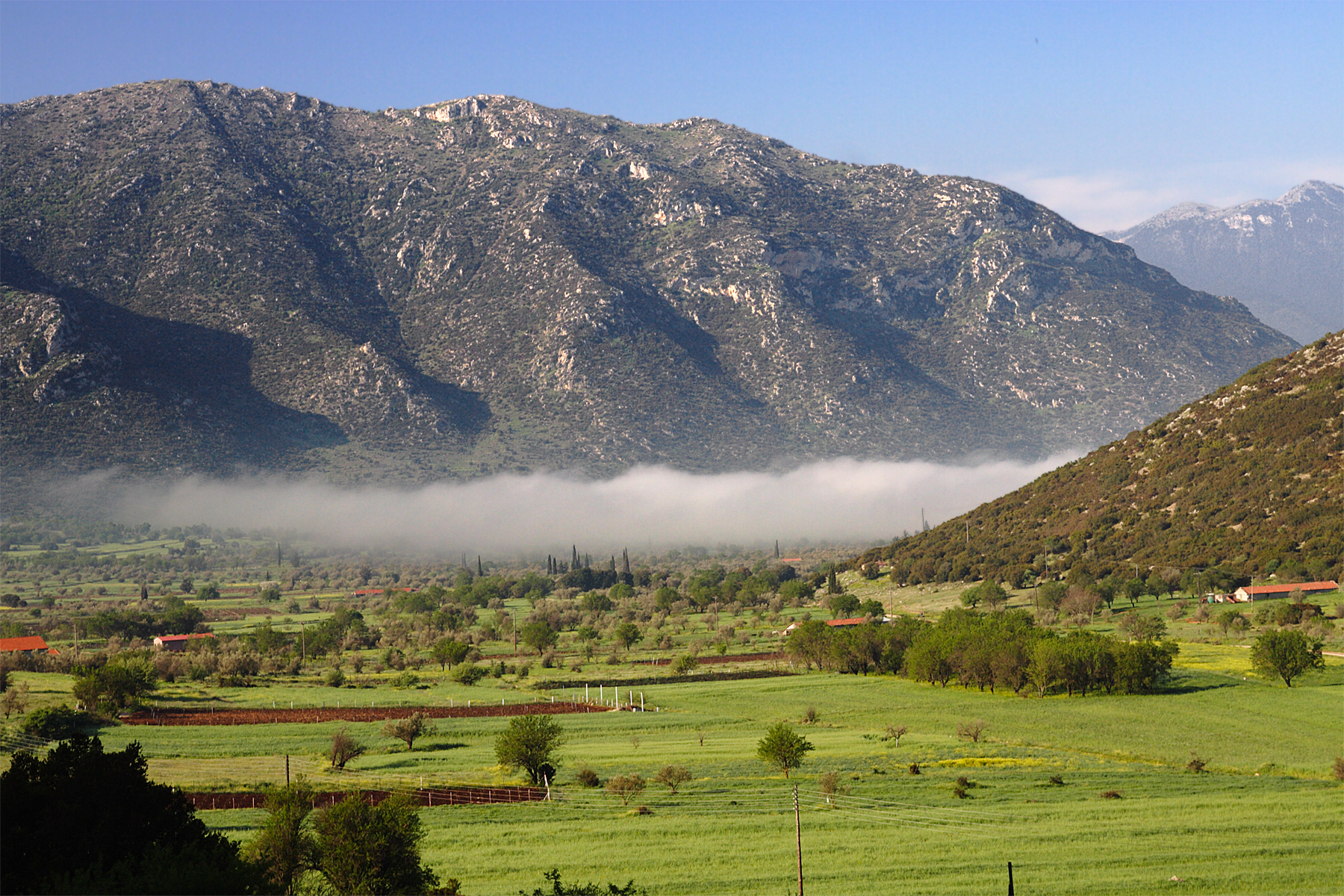
Geological basin of Vlacherna (Arcadia)-Chotoussa-Kandila. Arcadia, Peloponnese

Year	Population village	Population community
1981	1,162	–
1991	933	–
2001	846	898
2011	690	714
2021	541	559

== History ==
In a document from 1467, it was stated that the Fields of Kandila, (the Kandyliotikos Kampos) were farmed and had ample supply of water.

In 1777, following the Orlov events, many inhabitants of Kandila bearing the name "Sakkakos" (Greek: Σακκάκος) migrated to Koldere, near Magnesia (ad Sipylum).

In 1997, Kandila and all the surrounding communities were combined under the Kapodistrias law into one jurisdiction, to form the Municipality of Levidi.

== See also ==
- List of settlements in Arcadia
- Depression (geology)
- Karst
