= Oligyrtus =

Oligyrtus or Oligyrtos (Ancient Greek: Ὀλίγυρτος or Ὀλόγυρτος) was a fortress situated on a mountain of the same name in a pass between Stymphalus and Caphyae.
