= Oligyrtos =

Mountain in Greece

- Location within Greece

Highest point
- Elevation: 1,935 m (6,348 ft)
- Coordinates: 37°48′25″N 22°23′13″E

Geography
- Location: Arcadia, Corinthia and Argolis in Greece

Oligyrtos (Greek: Ὀλίγυρτος) is a mountain located at the junction of Arcadia, Corinthia and Argolis in the northeastern Peloponnese in Greece. The mountain diagonally stretches from southwest to northeast, with about 35 km length and 15 to 20 km breadth. Its highest point is the peak Skipiza, at 1,935 m elevation. Other peaks are Gkrimini (1,831 m), Parnias (1,800 m), Skiathis (1,777 m) and Mavrovouni (1,695 m). Neighboring mountain ranges are Kyllini (Ziria) to the north, Mainalo to the southwest, Trachy to the south and Chelmos (Aroania) to the northwest. Local flora consists mostly of grasslands and bushes. Pine trees and barren lands are found in higher areas. It is drained towards the Lake Stymphalia to the north, and towards the plain of Kandila to the south. In antiquity, the fortress Oligyrtus was located in a pass on the mountain.

== Nearest places ==
- North: Lafka
- South: Skoteini and Kandila
- West: Limni and Mati
