= Halos (Thessaly) =

Halos Ἅλος
- Town of ancient Thessaly
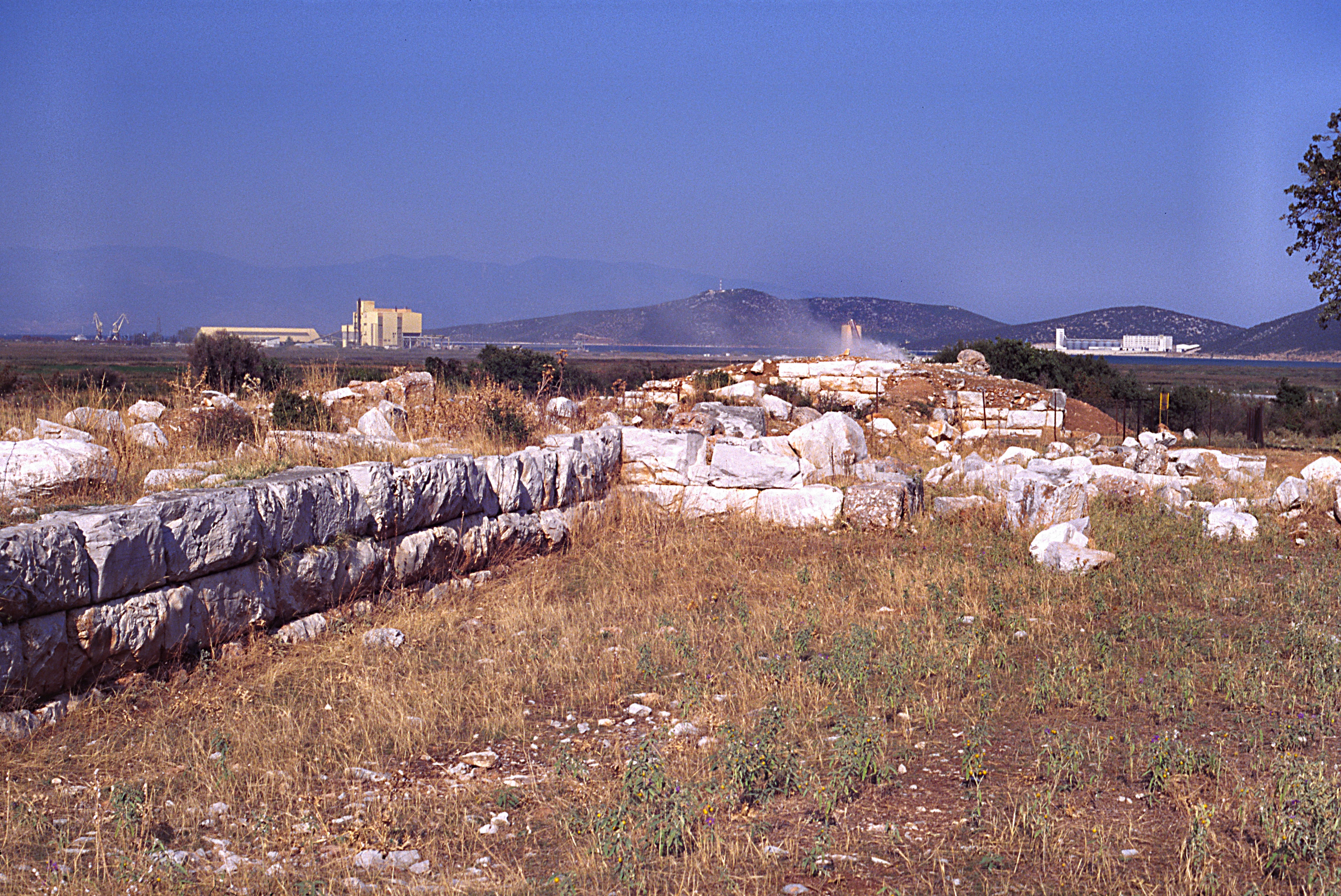
- The remains of ancient Halos

- Map of ancient Thessaly
- Country: Ancient Greece
- Location: Achaea Phthiotis
- Dialects: Aeolic
- Key periods: Third Sacred War

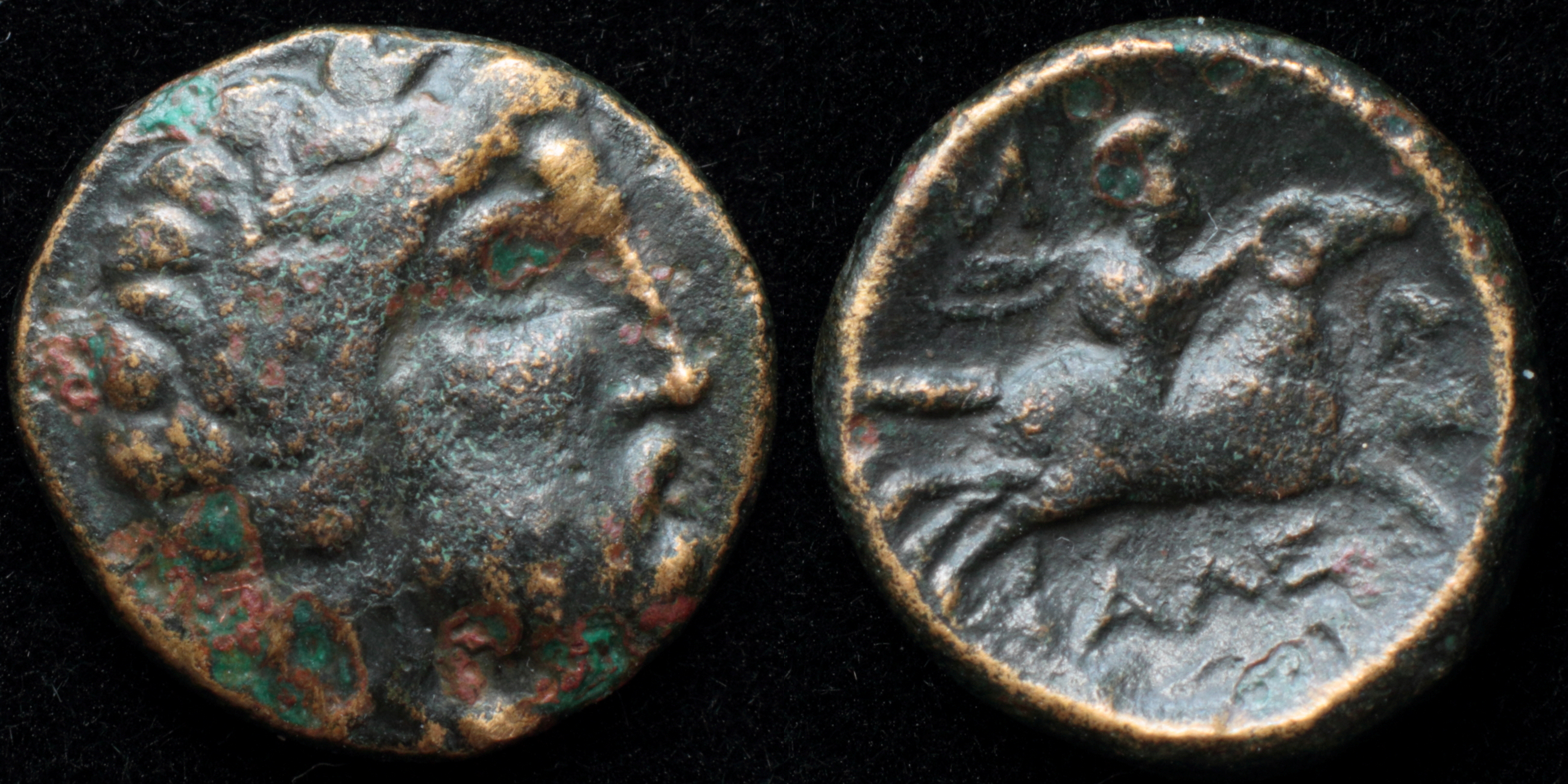
O: laureate head of Zeus R: Phrixos flying on ram, AΛEΩN This bronze dichalkon was struck in Halos in 3rd century BC.

Halos (Ancient Greek: Ἅλος), Latinised as Halus, was a town and polis in the region of Achaea Phthiotis in ancient Thessaly, on the west side of the Pagasetic Gulf.

== Location ==
It is located 10 km south from present-day Almyros. In Greek mythology Halos and Orchomenus are variously recorded as starting point of Phrixos' and Helle's flight to Colchis. The classical city, sometimes referred to as Old Halos, is located at Chorostasi, located at 39°09′43″N 22°50′31″E while the Hellenistic city, sometimes referred to as New Halos, is located nearby at Neos Platanos, located at 39°08′39″N 22°48′52″E.

== History ==
The Hellenistic city lies very close to the surface and is greatly disturbed, but several houses have been excavated by Dutch archaeologists. Greek colleagues have investigated a part of the city walls. This city was abandoned in the mid-third century, perhaps after an earthquake. A Byzantine fort is the last building phase from Antiquity. The town is mentioned in Homer's Catalogue of Ships in the Iliad. According to Strabo, the town was situated near the sea, at the extremity of Mount Othrys, above the plain called Crocium, of which the part around Halos was called Athamantium, from Athamas, the reputed founder of Halus. Strabo also says that the river Amphrysus, on the banks of which Apollo is said to have fed the oxen of Admetus, flowed near the walls of Halus.

The city is mentioned by Herodotus as one of the places where the Persian king Xerxes stayed in the summer of 480 BCE during his attack on Greece. The site of the classical city, which was destroyed in 346 BCE by Parmenion during the Third Sacred War, has been identified, but not excavated. The city was refounded in 302 BCE by Demetrius Poliorcetes. Several later writers mention the city, including Pliny the Elder and Pomponius Mela. In the sixth-century gazetteer Ethnica, Stephanus erroneously refers to the city as "Alea", confusing it with a town in Arcadia.

== Literature ==
- M. J. Haagsma, Domestic Economy and Social Organisation in New Halos (2010)
- Mogens Herman Hansen & Thomas Heine Nielsen, An Inventory of Archaic and Classical Poleis, Oxford University Press. ISBN 0198140991
- R. Reinders, New Halos. A Hellenistic Town in Thessalía, Greece (1988)
- R. Reinders and W. Prummel (eds.), Housing in New Halos. A Hellenistic Town in Thessaly, Greece (2003)
