= A66 =

A66, A 66 or A-66 may refer to:

== Roads ==
- A66 State Route (Australia), a road in South Australia connecting Keith and Port MacDonnell
- Autopista 66 (Cuba), motorway connecting the Autopista Nacional with Sancti Spiritus
- A66 road, a road connecting Middlesbrough and Penrith/Workington in England
- A66 motorway (France), a road connecting Villefranche-de-Lauragais and Pamiers
- A66 motorway (Germany), a road connecting the Taunus and Fulda
- A66 motorway (Spain), a road connecting Gijón and Seville

== Other uses ==
- Benoni Defense, in the Encyclopaedia of Chess Openings
- HLA-A66, an HLA-A serotype
