= Greek National Road 66 =

Trunk road in Greece

Coordinates: 37.8172°N 22.4710°E

National Road 66
- Εθνική Οδός 66
- Route of the EO66 road, in blue

Route information
- Length: 76.4 km (47.5 mi)
- Existed: 9 July 1963–present

Major junctions
- East end: Nemea station
- West end: Levidi

Location
- Country: Greece
- Regions: Peloponnese
- Primary destinations: Nemea station; Nemea; Psari; Skoteini; Kandila; Levidi

Highway system
- Highways in Greece; Motorways; National roads
← EO65	→ EO67

Greek National Road 66 (Greek: Εθνική Οδός 66), abbreviated as the EO66, is a national road in the Peloponnese region of Greece. The EO66 runs between Nemea station in the east and Levidi in the west, via Nemea.

== Route ==
The EO66 is officially defined as an east–west road within the Arcadia and Corinthia regional units: the EO66 runs between Nemea station in the east and Levidi in the west, passing through Nemea, Psari, Skoteini and Kandila. The EO66 connects with the A7 motorway and EO7 at the eastern end, and the EO33 at the western end.

== History ==
Ministerial Decision G25871 of 9 July 1963 created the EO66 from the old EO57, which existed by royal decree from 1955 until 1963, and followed the same route as the current EO66.
