= Teuthras =

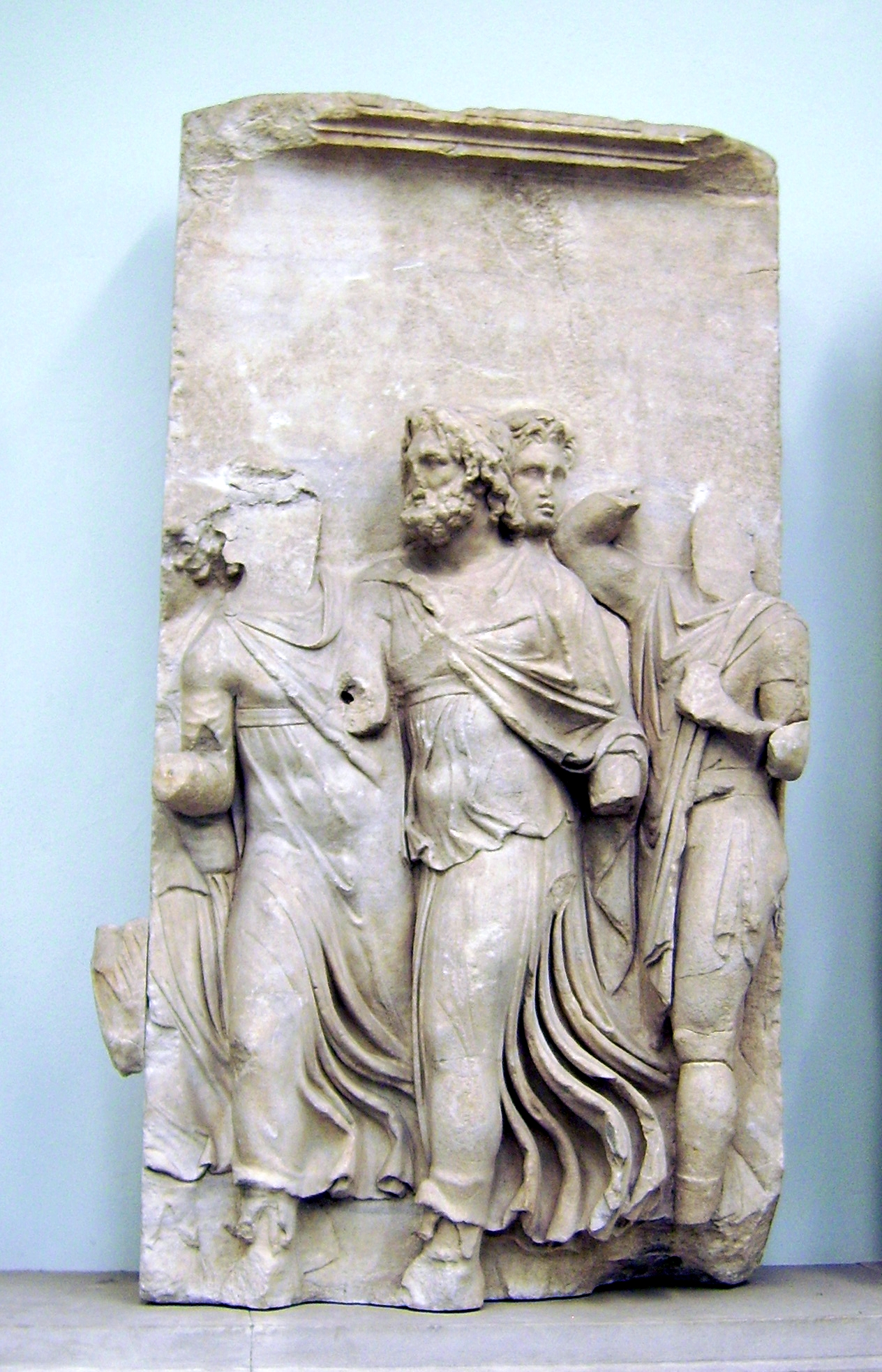
Teuthras finds Auge on the Beach; from the Telephos frieze of the Pergamon Altar at the Antikensammlung/Pergamonmuseum in Berlin

In Greek mythology, Teuthras (Ancient Greek: Τεύθρας, gen. Τεύθραντος) was a king of Mysia, and mythological eponym of the town of Teuthrania.

== Family ==
In the Iliad, Teuthras is said to be the father of Axylus. Elsewhere, he has a son called Teuthranius with Auge. Both died fighting in the Trojan War.

According to Dictys Cretensis, he also fathered Tecmessa. Alternatively, she is daughter of the Phrygian Teleutas.

== Mythology ==
Teuthras received Auge, the ill-fated mother of Telephus, and either married her or adopted her as his own daughter. Later on, Idas was attempting to dethrone Teuthras and take possession of his kingdom. Telephus, who had previously been instructed by the Delphian oracle to sail to Mysia if he wanted to find out who his mother was, arrived in time to provide aid for Teuthras and defeated Idas. He and Auge then recognized each other. Teuthras gave Telephus his daughter Argiope to wife and, since he had no male children, pronounced him successor to the kingdom of Mysia. In other versions of the myth, Auge and the young Telephus were not separated, so Teuthras received them both and raised Telephus as his own. There even existed a version that made Teuthras biological father of Telephus by Auge.

== See also ==
- List of Trojan War characters
