= Cassotis =

Nymph in Greek mythology

According to Pausanias, Cassotis (Ancient Greek: Κασσοτίς) was a nymph from Parnassus, and the eponym of a spring at the Oracle at Delphi which was dedicated to Apollo.
