= Virginia State Route 66 =

The following highways in Virginia have been known as State Route 66:

- Virginia State Route 66 (1933-1940), now part of U.S. Route 58 Alternate
- Virginia State Route 66 (1940-1958), now State Route 65
- Interstate 66 (Virginia), 1957–present
