= Mount Parthenion =

Mountain on the border of Arcadia and Argolis, in the Peloponnese, Greece

Coordinates: 37.4864°N 22.5474°E

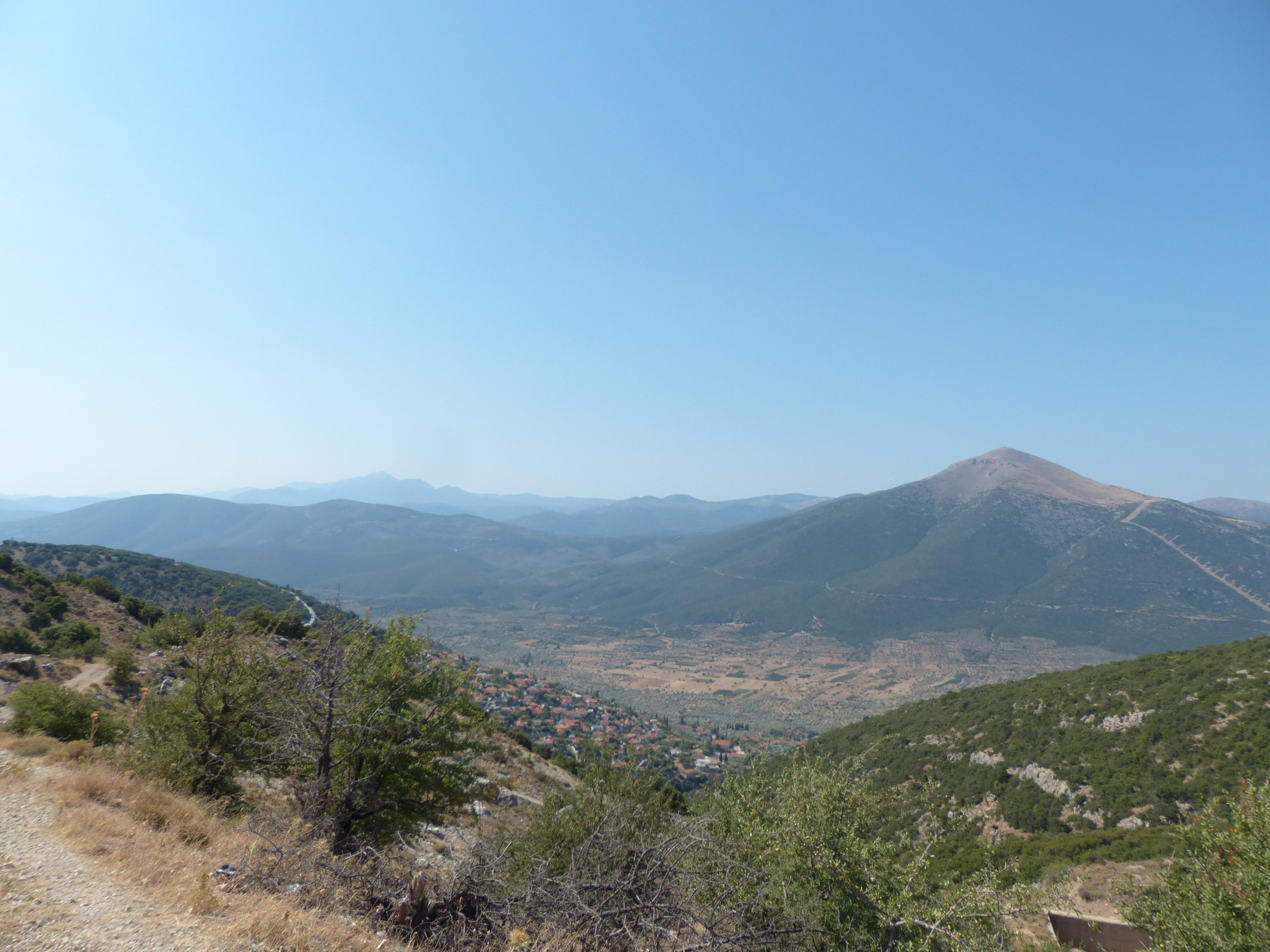
Mount Parthenion (right)

Mount Parthenion (Ancient Greek: τὸ Παρθένιον ὄρος) or Parthenius or Parthenium) ("Mount of the Virgin", modern Greek: Παρθένιο - Parthenio) is a mountain on the border of Arcadia and Argolis, in the Peloponnese, Greece. Its elevation is 1,215 m. It is situated between the villages Achladokampos to the northeast and Partheni to the southwest. It is 16 km east of Tripoli.

In antiquity, it divided the little plain of Hysiae from that of Tegea. Mount Parthenion is the mountain where the hero Telephus was exposed. Below its slopes lay Tegea. Pan appeared to Philippides on Mt. Parthenion above Tegea, before the battle of Marathon in 490 BCE. The god called out his name and ordered Philippides ask the Athenians why they paid no honors to him, even though he was well-intentioned toward them, had been helpful to them many times in the past and would be so again in the future. As a result, the Athenians established an altar to Pan at the foot of the Parthenon.
