= Athena Alea =

Ancient Greek mythological epithet

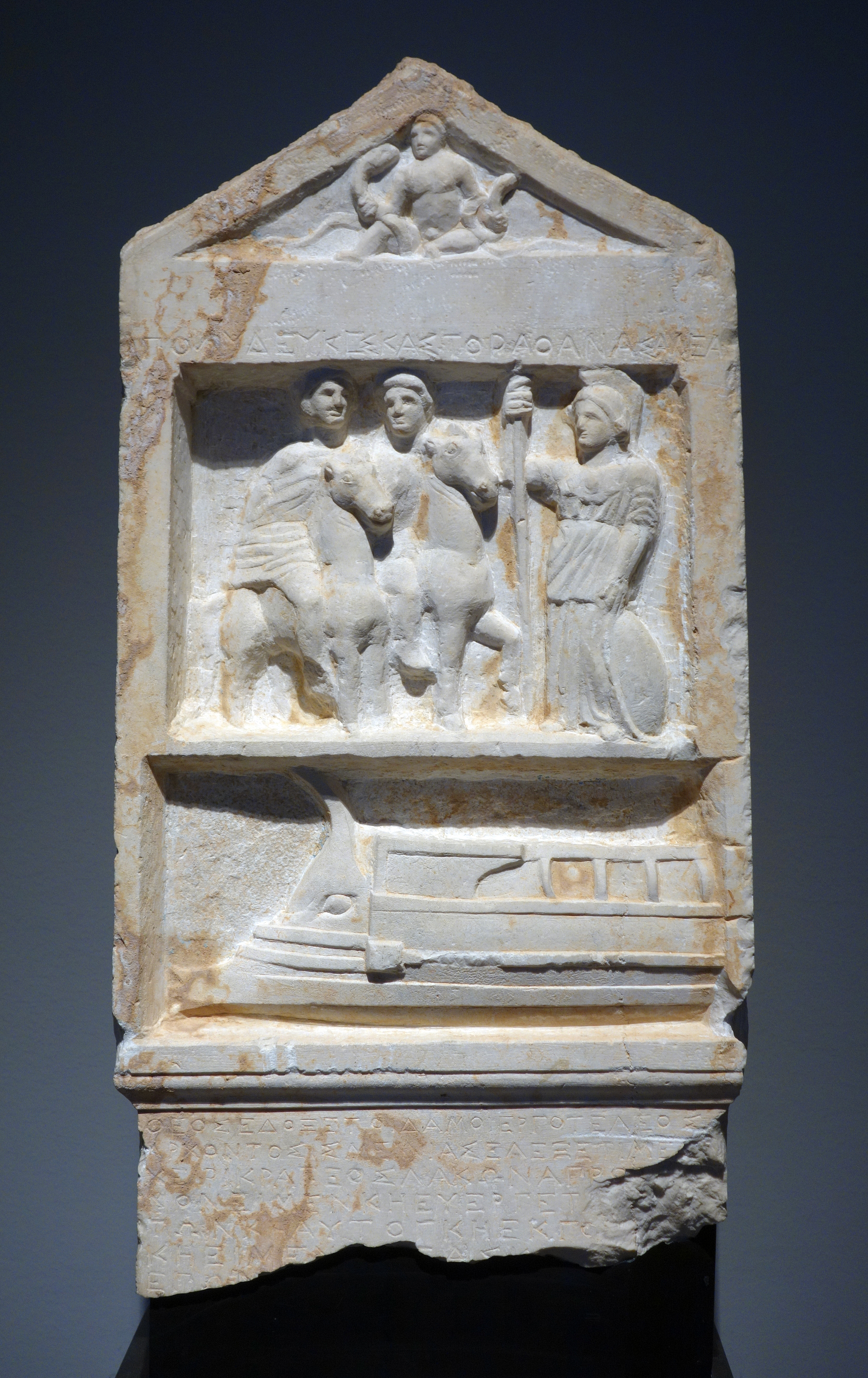
Boeotian proxeny stele depicting Athena Alea with the Dioscuri above a warship, with the infant Heracles strangling snakes in the pediment, c. 369–363 BCE

Alea (Ancient Greek: Ἀλέα) was an epithet of the Greek goddess Athena, prominent in Arcadian mythology, under which she was worshiped at Alea, Mantineia and Tegea. Alea was initially an independent goddess, but was eventually assimilated with Athena. A statue of Athena Alea existed on the road from Sparta to Therapne. Her most important sanctuary was the famous Temple of Athena Alea at Tegea.

== Goddess and association with Athena ==
Alea was a local deity in eastern Arcadia, who later became associated with, and an epithet of Athena as Athena Alea. Other known cults of Alea, alongside Athena, are also found in other nearby locations, such as Mantinea and in Sparta. Additionally, a small city-state in eastern Arcadia was also called Alea. Evidence from the Classical period points towards the use of Athena and Alea in conjunction with each other; for example, the fifth century historian Herodotus mentions the Temple of Alea Athena twice, whilst Tegean coins from the fourth century refer to Athena Alea instead. This provides support that the two goddesses were spoken about in conjunction. But, as McInerny highlights, this may be an oversimplification of a complex issue. Instead, he proposes to look towards the account of the second century CE geographer Pausanias who provides more details on the issue of the synchronization of the two goddesses.

Pausanias provides two hints to the survival of the goddess Alea in his Description of Greece: first, when discussing Athena in the Peloponnese, he states that the local practice of calling her Alea has prevailed in Tegea; second, he mentions a local festival called the Aleaia, indicating a festival in the honour of Alea rather than Athena. Therefore, the synchronization between the two goddesses illustrates a process of unifying two important goddess whilst maintaining some local distinctions, rather than an Olympian goddess usurping a local deity.

== Hera Alea ==
In addition to the synchronised Athena Alea, we have a literary record of a Hera Alea in the Ancient Greek city-state of Sicyon. This comes from a scholium to Pindar' Nemean Ode 9, providing further evidence of Alea's ability to spread to regions near Tegea.

== Bibliography ==
- Head, Barclay. (1897) Historia numorum; a manual of Greek numismatics, Oxford: Clarendon Press, Internet Archive.
- Jost, Madeleine. (1985) Sanctuaires et cultes d’Arcadie. Paris: J. Vrin, Cefael.
- Jost, Madeleine. (2003) "Arcadian Cults and Myths", in Simon Hornblower and Anthony Spawforth. eds. Oxfords Classical Dictionary 3rd Edition, Oxford: Oxford University Press.
- McInerney, Jeremey. (2013) "The Gods of (Con)Fusion: Athena Alea, Apollo Maleatas and Athena Aphaia", Classica et Mediavalia. 64. 49–80. Academia.
