= Skoteini =

Skoteini Σκοτεινή
- Community
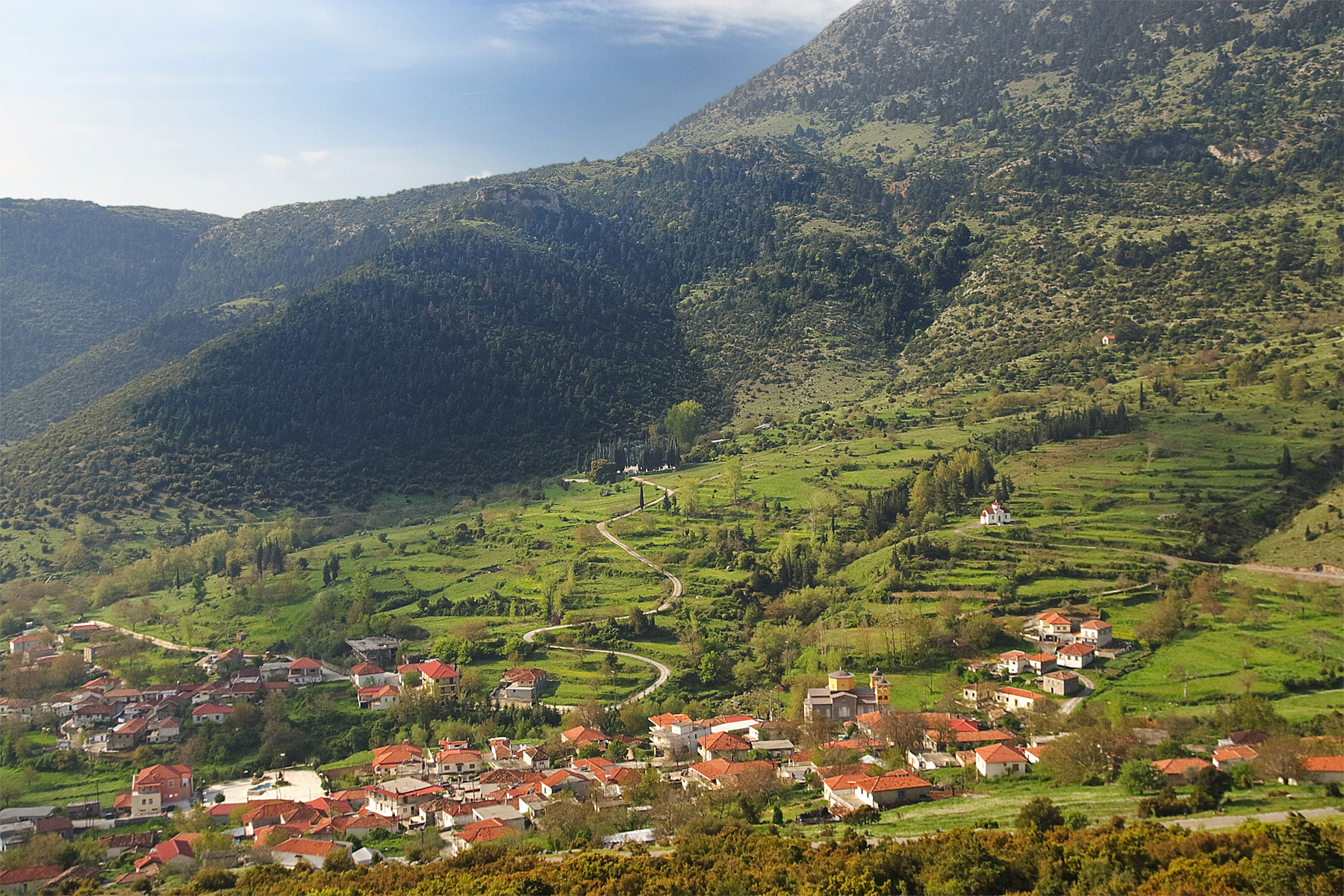

- Location within Greece
- Coordinates: 37°47′N 22°26′E
- Country: Greece
- Administrative region: Peloponnese
- Regional unit: Argolis
- Municipality: Argos-Mykines
- Municipal unit: Alea
- Elevation: 690 m (2,260 ft)

Population (2021)
  - Community: 267
- Time zone: UTC+2 (EET)
  - Summer (DST): UTC+3 (EEST)

Skoteini (Greek: Σκοτεινή) is a small village 57 kilometres northwest of the town of Argos in the Peloponnese, southern Greece. It has an area of 44 km^{2} and sits at an altitude of 690 meters above sea level. Its name derives from the Greek word for "darkness".

According to the 2021 census, the population of Skoteini was 267, a drop from the 1981 census, when the town was inhabited by 412 people.

"Driving through the plain of Alea, you reach the village of Skoteini, one of the most beautiful landscapes of Argolida County. It holds a key post, as it is a passage of all three counties (Argolida, Arcadia, and Corinthia). Skoteini was gradually built in three locations and it is now situated upon two mountainsides. Skoteini has always been a large village. It contains many new houses, cafes, bars, an elementary school and a high school. It is a lively and modern mountainous village that has adopted the new way of living. " According to the current (June 2022) greek wikipedia-page „Σκοτεινή Αργολίδας“ had a population of 750 in 1951.

The village rests high on a side of the mountain chain Oligyrtos, whose sediments during geological ages gradually weathered and became an alluvial fan. The sediments are now a fertile slope. Detrital slopes also filled the bottom of the Skoteini-Alea-Plain - a valley, 15 km from north to south. In this plain generations of the villagers earned their living by animal husbandry (mainly goats) and agriculture.

The soil was well soaked naturally by precipitation or had to be drained by regulated runnels and a poor brook. However, larger streams or rivers never developed in the plain. The water did rather seep through the porous karstic rock formations (limestone) underneath and formed continually widening joints, even caves and subsurface waterways. The plain remained flattened. People struggled to cope with difficult climates, the soil often becoming dried up too much or getting seasonally flooded.

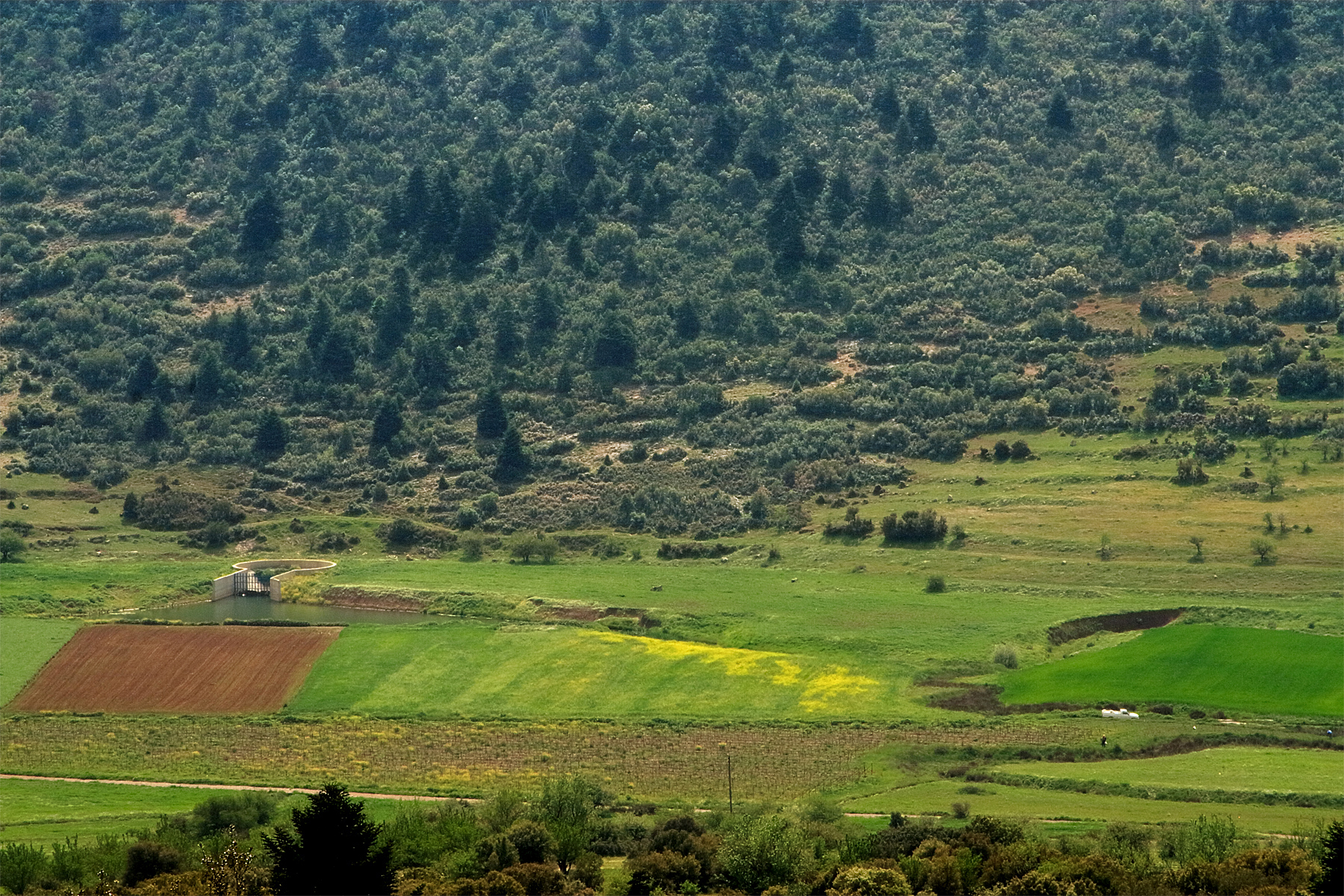
Regulated northern katavothra in the Skoteini-Alea-Plain

Nature’s solution was to drain by developing two ponors on the surface - one at each end of the plain. In Greece a ponor is called “katavothra".

To ensure faster and better drainage before the start of the growing season, the two katavothras are nowadays reinforced to prevent larger debris from clogging them. There are many katavothres in the Peloponnese.
