= Alea (Arcadia) =

Coordinates: 37°45′28″N 22°27′22″E

Alea (Ancient Greek: Ἀλέα) was a town of ancient Arcadia, between Orchomenus and Stymphalus. In the time of Pausanias, 2nd century, it contained temples of the Ephesian Artemis, of Athena Alea, and of Dionysus. It appears to have been situated in the territory either of Stymphalus or Orchomenus. Alea was never a town of importance; but some writers have, though inadvertently, placed at this town the celebrated temple of Athena Alea, which was situated at Tegea.

Its site is located near the modern Alea, which was renamed to reflect association with the ancient town.
