= Alipherus =

Ancient Greek mythological figure

- Eponymous King of Aliphera
- Member of the Arcadian Royal Family
- Abode: Arcadia

Genealogy
- Parents: Lycaon and Cyllene or Nonacris
- Siblings: Acacus, Aseatas, Caucon, Ceteus, Charisius, Cleitor, Cromus, Daseatas, Eleuther, Euaemon, Haemon, Helisson, Heraeus, Hypsus, Lebadus, Lycius, Macar, Macedon, Maenalus, Mantineus, Melaeneus, Nyctimus, Oenotrus, Orchomenus, Orestheus, Pallas, Parrhasius, Peraethus, Phigalus, Phthius, Stymphalus, Tegeates, Thesprotus, Thocnus, Thyraeus, Trapezeus, Tricolonus, etc.

Alipherus or Halipherus (Ancient Greek: Ἀλίφηρος or Ἀλιφήρου) was in Greek mythology, an Arcadian prince as one of the 50 sons of the impious King Lycaon either by the naiad Cyllene, Nonacris or by unknown woman.

== Mythology ==
Alipherus and his siblings were the most nefarious and carefree of all people. To test them, Zeus visited them in the form of a peasant. These brothers mixed the entrails of a child into the god's meal, whereupon the enraged king of the gods threw the meal over the table. Alipherus was killed, along with his brothers and their father, by a lightning bolt of the god.

The town of Aliphera in Greece was traditionally believed to have been founded by this Alipherus, and to have derived its name from him.
