= Arcadia (regional unit) =

Arcadia Περιφερειακή ενότητα Αρκαδίας
- Regional unit
- Municipalities of Arcadia

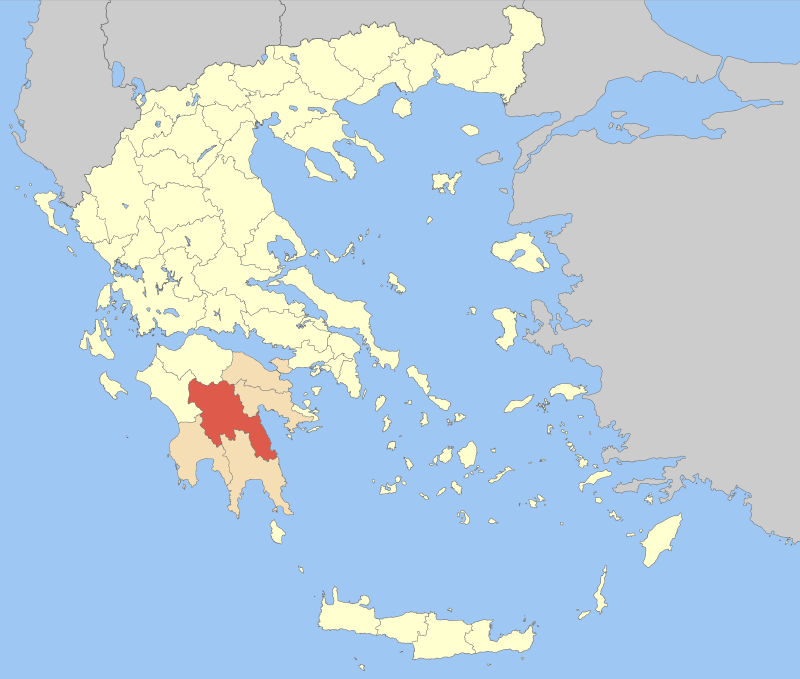
- Arcadia within Greece

- Location within Greece
- Coordinates: 37°35′N 22°15′E
- Country: Greece
- Administrative region: Peloponnese
- Seat: Tripoli

Area
  - Total: 4,419 km^{2} (1,706 sq mi)

Population (2021)
  - Total: 77,592
  - Density: 17.56/km^{2} (45.48/sq mi)
- Demonym: Arcadian(s)
- Time zone: UTC+2 (EET)
  - Summer (DST): UTC+3 (EEST)
- Postal code: 22x xx
- Area code: 2710, 275x0, 279x0
- Vehicle registration: ΤΡ
- Website: Official website (archived)

Arcadia (Greek: Αρκαδία, romanized: Arkadía Modern Greek: [ɐr.kɐˈði.ɐ]) is one of the regional units of Greece. It is part of the administrative region of Peloponnese. It is in the central and eastern part of the Peloponnese peninsula. It takes its name from the mythological figure Arcas. In Greek mythology, it was the home of the god Pan.

== Geography ==
Arcadia is a rural, mountainous regional unit comprising about 18% of the land area of the Peloponnese peninsula. It is the peninsula's largest regional unit. According to the 2021 census, it has 77,592 inhabitants; its capital, Tripoli, has about 30,400 residents in the city proper, and about 44,000 total in the greater metropolitan area.

Arcadia consists partly of farmland, and to a larger extent grassland and degenerated shrubland. It also has three mountain ranges, with forestation mainly at altitudes above 1000 meters: Mainalo, a winter ski resort, situated in the central north; Parnon in the central south; and Mount Lykaion, famous for the ancient history and myths associated with it, in the southwest.

Its climate features hot summers and mild winters in the east, the south, and those parts of the central area that are less than 1000 meters above sea level. Fall and winter are mostly rainy, except in the mountains to the west and north, Taygetus and Mainalo, which are snowy in winter.

== Geology and Hydrogeology ==
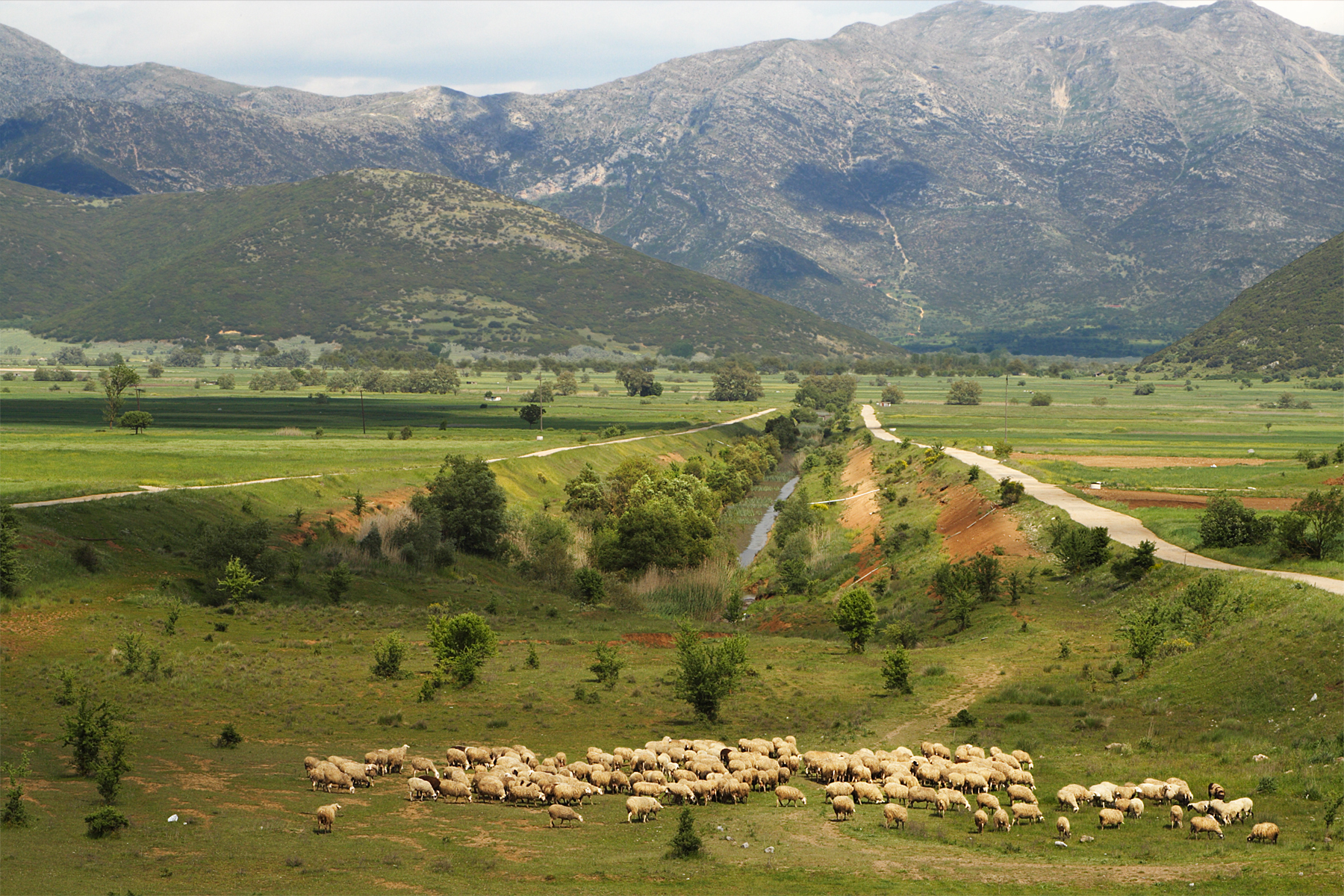
Closed Basin Vlacherna/Hotoussa/Kandila

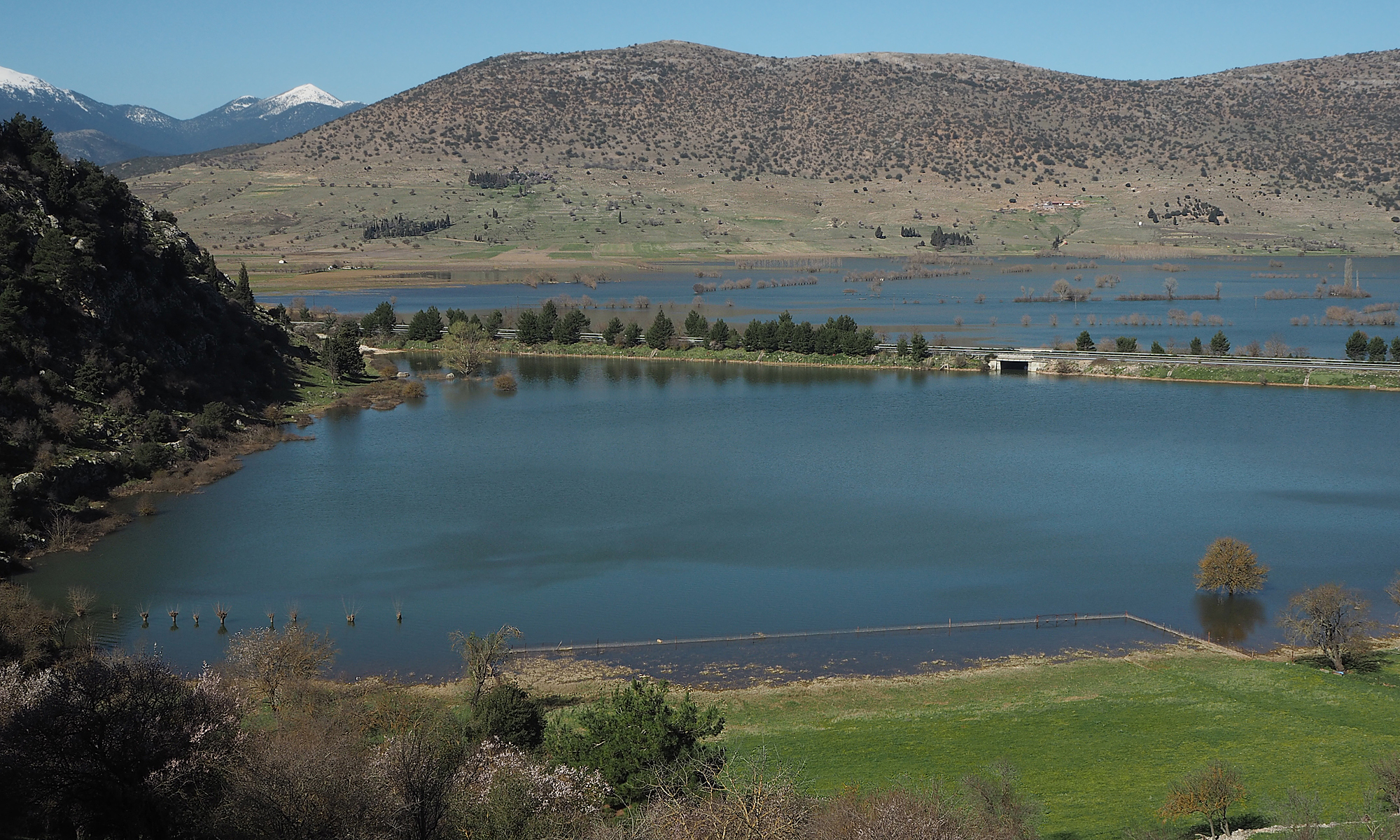
Temporary lake Argon Pedion, March 2019

Arcadia is almost totally mountainous and part of the "carbonate platform" (calcareous or limestone deposits) of the Peloponnese. The whole peninsula was formed by intense tectonics (faults, overthrusts and regional metamorphism). In Arcadia's central part around the Tripoli region developed a special form of topography, a geologically fascinating phenomenon: There are several plains and "intra mountainous basins", even "closed basins": The 30 km long "Tripoli-Plateau", "Argon Pedion", Basin of Levidi, Basin of Vlacherna Arcadia/Hotoussa/Kandila.

The peculiarity of the plains and basins is a result of intensive karstification: Water seeps into the underground, rather than eroding and draining the topography by surface waterways. All drainage runs through ponors (in Greek: καταβόθρες) and subterranean waterways. The additional problem for rural activities in the basins: When winter rains are heavy, the ground is flooded or temporary lakes arise, even today, as drainage through katavothres is often too slow to start cultivation in due time.

== History ==
=== Ancient history ===
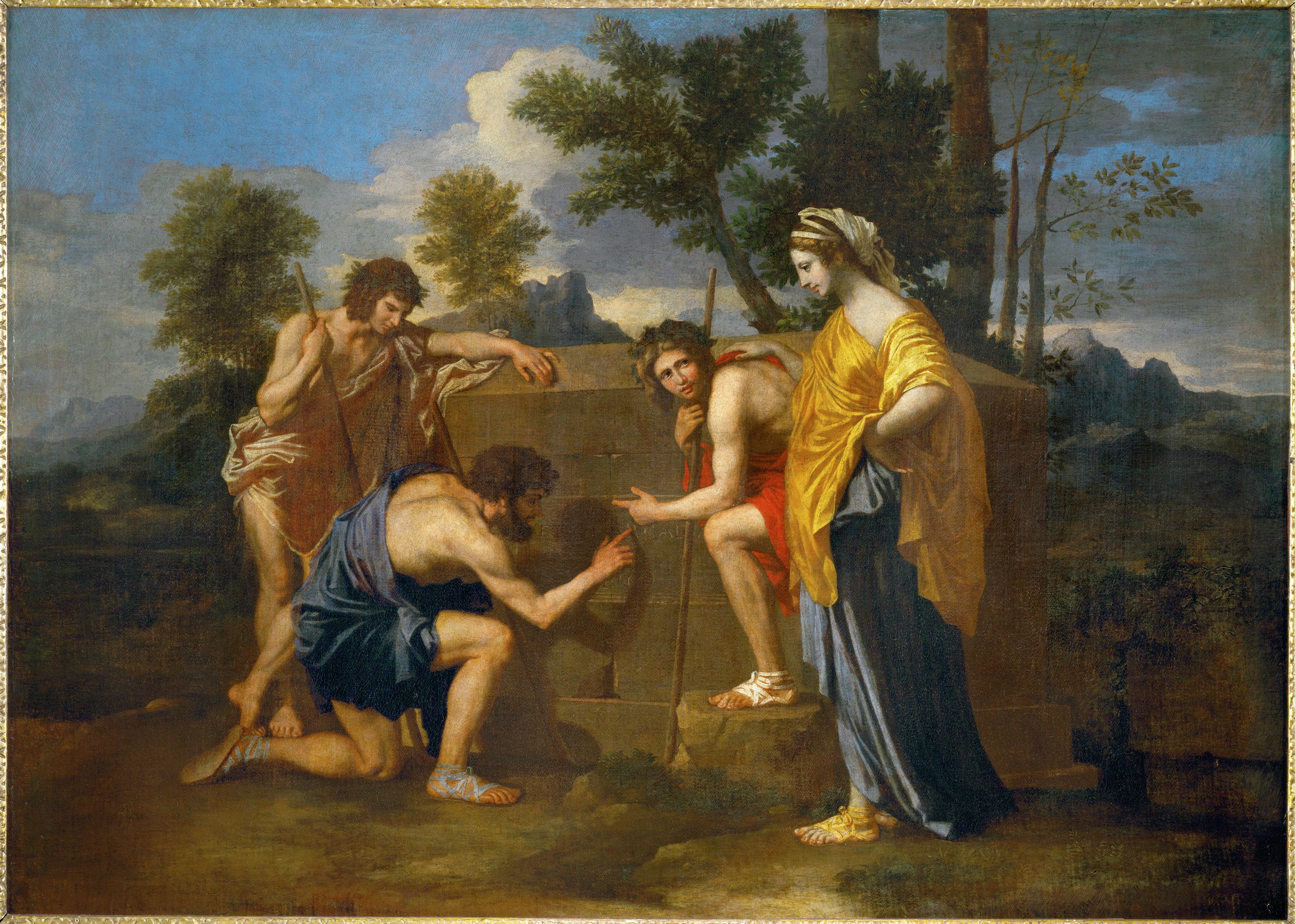
"Les Bergers d’Arcadie" by Nicolas Poussin.

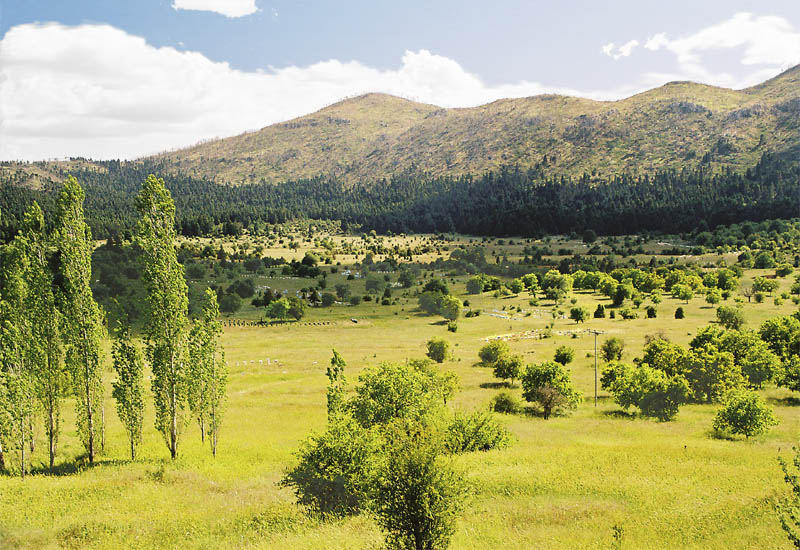
Landscape of Arcadia.

=== Medieval history ===
After the collapse of the Roman Empire in the west, Arcadia remained as part of the Greek-speaking Byzantine Empire. Arcadia remained a beautiful, secluded area, and its inhabitants became proverbial as herdsmen leading simple pastoral unsophisticated yet happy lives, to the point that Arcadia may refer to some imaginary idyllic paradise, immortalized by Virgil's Eclogues, and later by Jacopo Sannazaro in his pastoral masterpiece, Arcadia (1504); see also Arcadia (utopia).

After the Fourth Crusade, the area became a part of the Principality of Achaea, but was progressively recovered by the Byzantine Greeks of the Despotate of the Morea from the 1260s on, a process that was completed in 1320. The region fell into the hands of the Ottoman Turks along with the rest of the Despotate in 1460. With the exception of a period of Venetian rule in 1687–1715, the region remained under Turkish control until 1821.

The Latin phrase Et in Arcadia ego, which is usually interpreted to mean "Even in Arcadia there am I", is an example of memento mori, a cautionary reminder of the transitory nature of life and the inevitability of death. The phrase is most often associated with a 1647 painting by Nicolas Poussin, also known as "The Arcadian Shepherds". In the painting the phrase appears as an inscription on a tomb discovered by youthful figures in classical garb.

=== Modern history ===
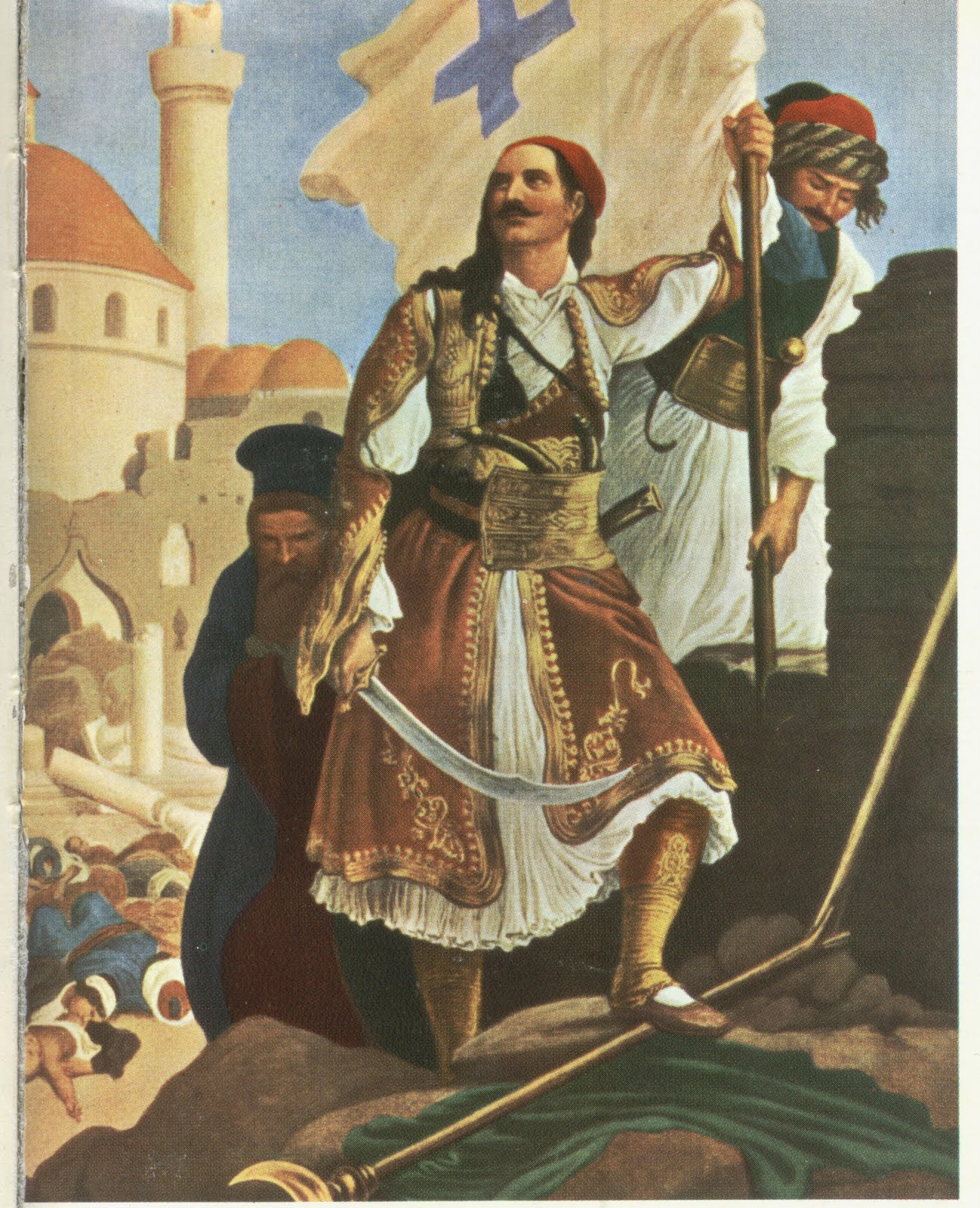
Commander Panagiotis Kephalas raising the Maniot flag in Tripoli (Tripolitsa), the capital of Arcadia, after the successful siege.

Arcadia was one of the centres of the Greek War of Independence which saw victories in their battles including one in Tripoli. After a victorious revolutionary war, Arcadia was finally incorporated into the newly created Greek state. Arcadia saw economic growth and small emigration.

In the 20th century, Arcadia experienced extensive population loss through emigration, mostly to the Americas. Many Arcadian villages lost half their inhabitants, and fears arose that they would turn into ghost towns. Arcadia now has a smaller population than Corinthia. Demographers expected that its population would halve between 1951 and the early 21st century. The population has fallen to 87,000 in 2011.

An earthquake measuring 5.9 on the Richter magnitude scale shook Megalopoli and the surrounding area in 1965. Large numbers of buildings were destroyed, leaving people homeless. Within a couple of years, the buildings were rebuilt anti-seismically. This earthquake revealed an underground source of lignite in the area, and in 1967 construction began on the Megalopoli Power Plant, which began operating in 1970. The mining area south of the plant is the largest mining area in the peninsula and continues to the present day with one settlement moved.

In July and August 2007 forest fires caused damage in Arcadia, notably in the mountains.

In 2008, a theory proposed by classicist Christos Mergoupis suggested that the mummified remains of Alexander the Great (not his actual tomb), may in fact be located in Gortynia-Arkadia, in the Peloponnese of Greece. Since 2008, this research is ongoing and currently being conducted in Greece. The research was first mentioned on CNN International in May 2008.

== Language ==
When, during the Greek Dark Ages (c. 1200 BC–800 BC), Doric Greek was introduced to the Peloponnese, the older Arcadocypriot Greek language apparently survived in Arcadia. Arcadocypriot never became a literary dialect, but it is known from inscriptions. Tsan is a letter of the Greek alphabet occurring only in Arcadia, shaped like Cyrillic И; it represents an affricate that developed from labiovelars in context where they became t in other dialects.

The Tsakonian language, still spoken on the coast of modern Arcadia (but in the Classical period considered the southern Argolid coast immediately adjoining Arcadia), is a descendant of Doric Greek, and as such is an exceptional example of a surviving regional dialect of archaic Greek. The principal cities of Tsakonia are the Arcadian coastal towns of Leonidio and Tyros.

== Administration ==
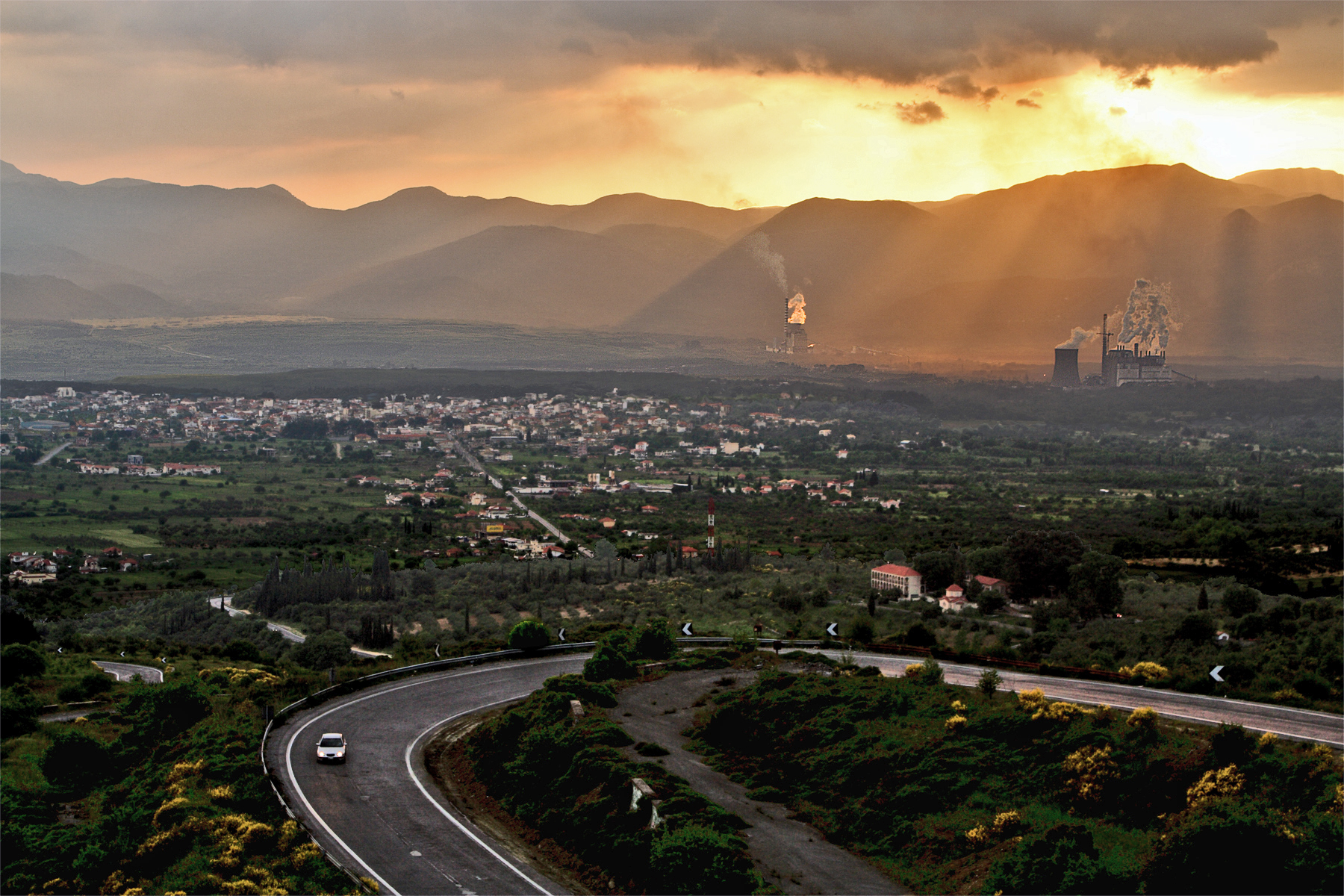
Megalopoli

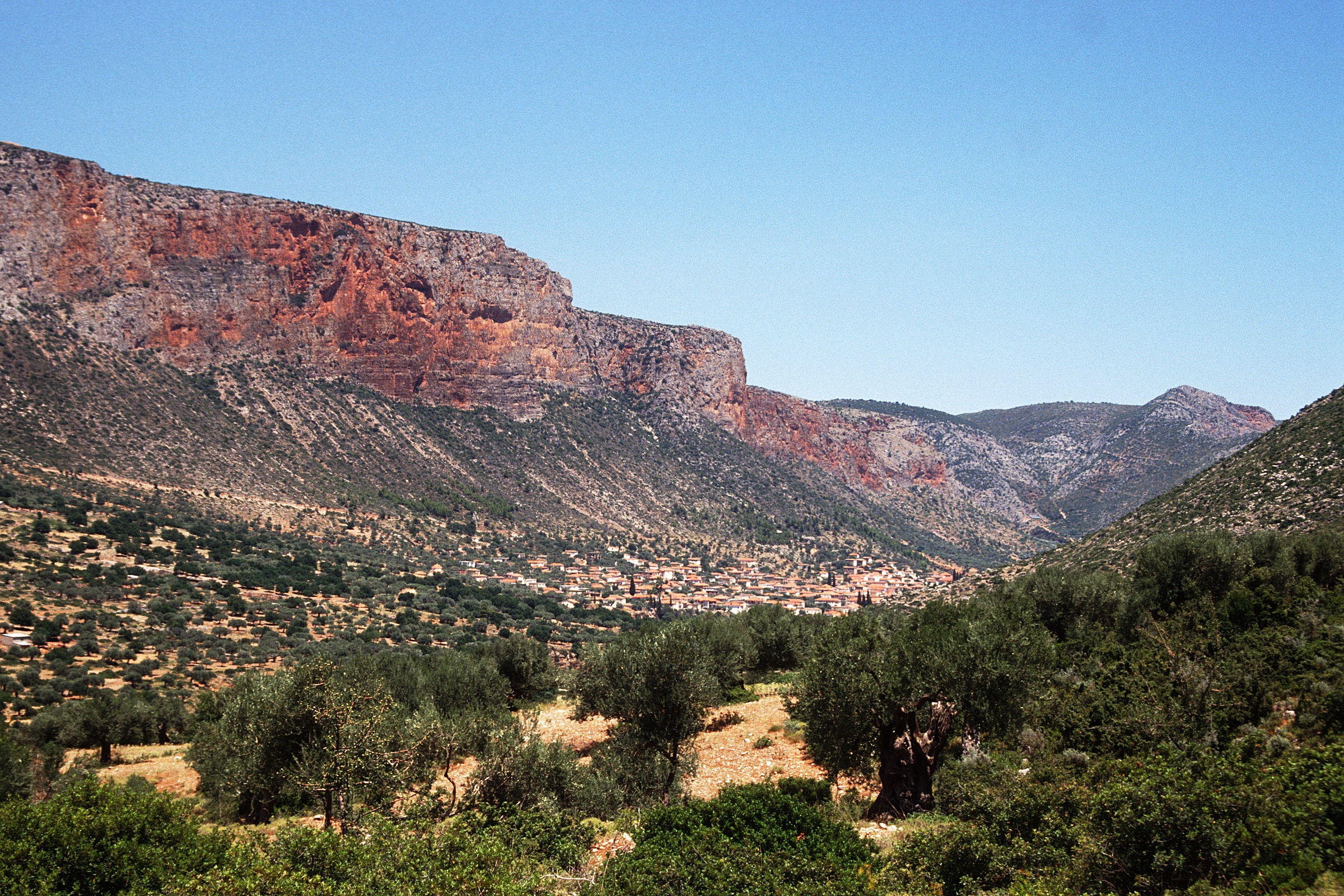
Leonidio

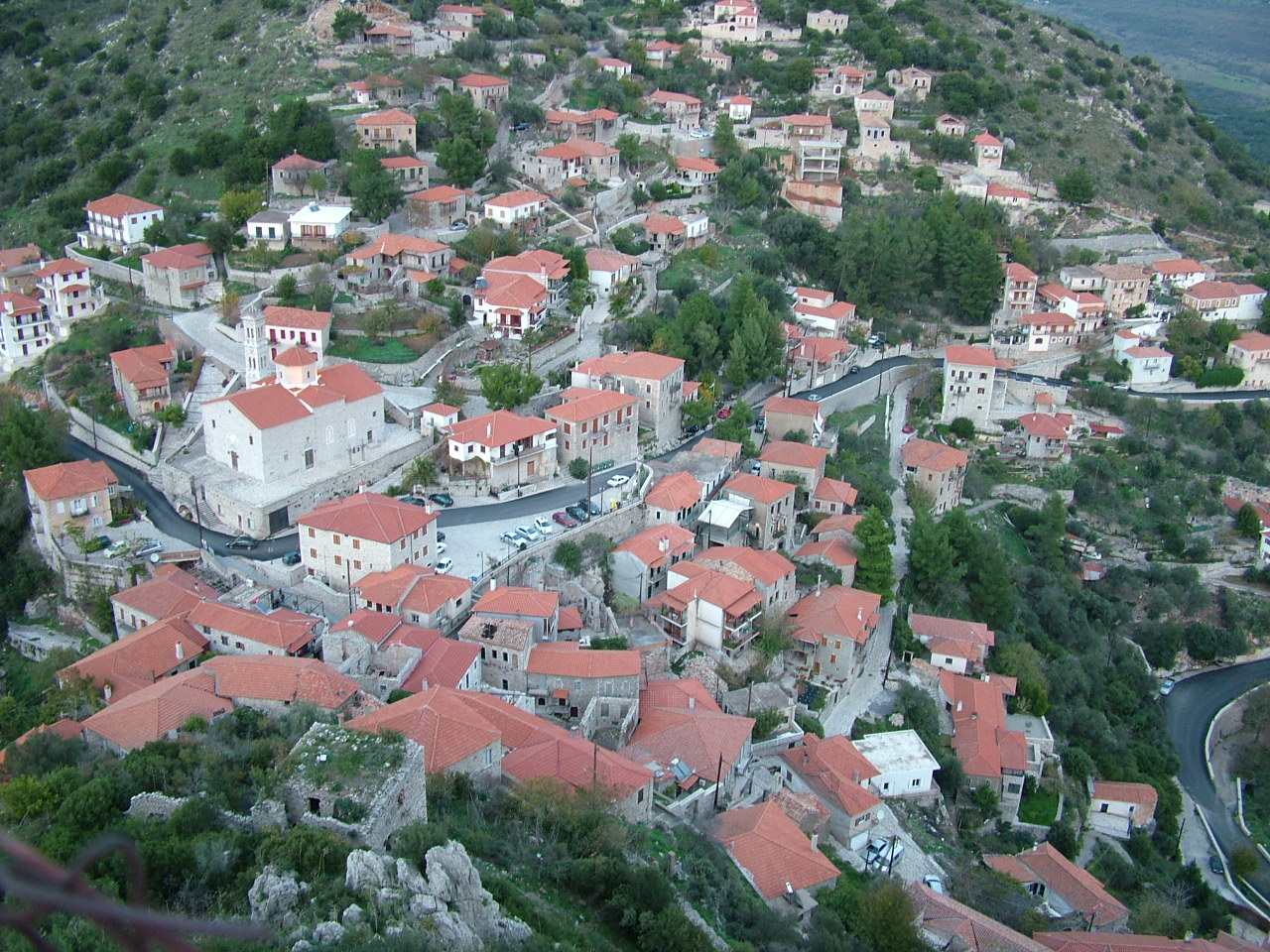
Karytaina

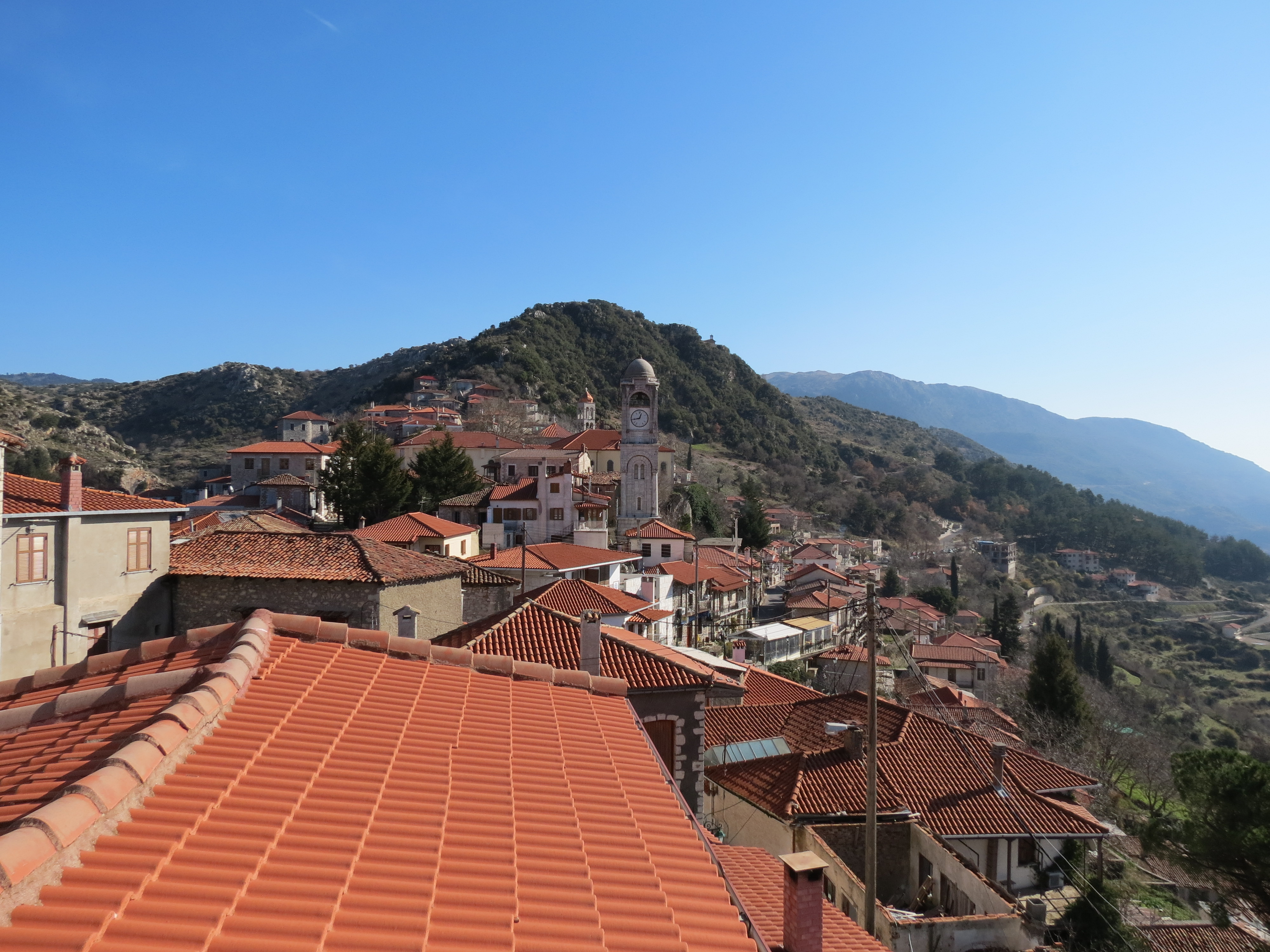
Dimitsana

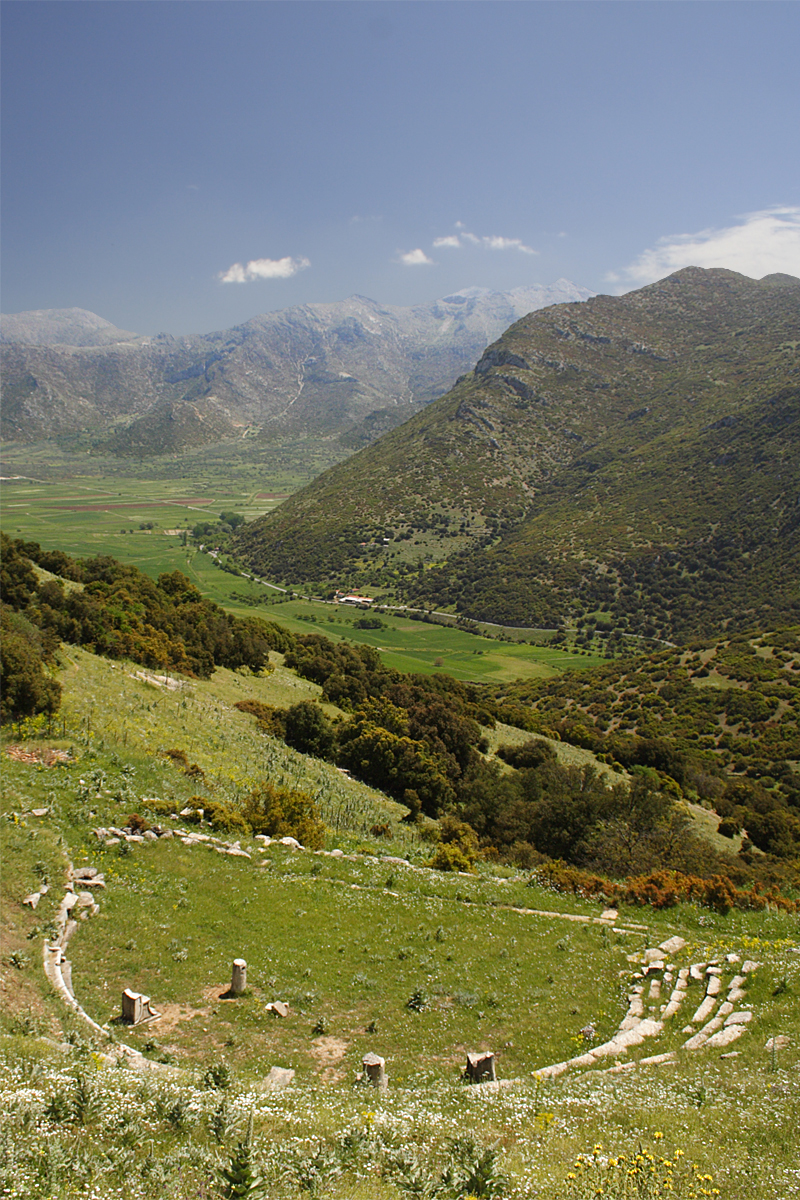
Ancient site of Orchomenus (Arcadia) and the Karst basin, in Pausanias' time (AD 110 – ca. 180) with a lake

The regional unit Arcadia is subdivided into five municipalities. (Numbered as on map in infobox):

- Gortynia (3)
- Megalopoli (5)
- North Kynouria (Voreia Kynouria, 2)
- South Kynouria (Notia Kynouria, 4)
- Tripoli (1)

=== Prefecture ===
As a part of the 2011 Kallikratis government reform, the regional unit Arcadia was created out of the former prefecture Arcadia (Greek: Νομός Αρκαδίας). The prefecture had the same territory as the present regional unit. At the same time, the municipalities were reorganised, according to the table below.

New municipality	Old municipalities	Seat
Gortynia	Dimitsana	Dimitsana
Gortynia	Vytina	Dimitsana
Gortynia	Iraia	Dimitsana
Gortynia	Kleitor	Dimitsana
Gortynia	Kontovazaina	Dimitsana
Gortynia	Langadia	Dimitsana
Gortynia	Trikolonoi	Dimitsana
Gortynia	Tropaia	Dimitsana
Megalopoli	Megalopoli	Megalopoli
Megalopoli	Gortyna	Megalopoli
Megalopoli	Falaisia	Megalopoli
North Kynouria (Voreia Kynouria)	North Kynouria	Astros
South Kynouria (Notia Kynouria)	Leonidio	Leonidio
South Kynouria (Notia Kynouria)	Kosmas	Leonidio
South Kynouria (Notia Kynouria)	Tyros	Leonidio
Tripoli	Tripoli	Tripoli
Tripoli	Valtetsi	Tripoli
Tripoli	Korythio	Tripoli
Tripoli	Levidi	Tripoli
Tripoli	Mantineia	Tripoli
Tripoli	Skiritida	Tripoli
Tripoli	Tegea	Tripoli
Tripoli	Falanthos	Tripoli

=== Provinces ===
Arcadia was divided into four provinces:

- Province of Gortynia—Dimitsana
- Province of Kynouria—Leonidio
- Province of Mantineia—Tripolis
- Province of Megalopoli—Megalopolis

Note: Provinces no longer hold any legal status in Greece.

=== Ancient and modern towns and cities ===
The main towns in modern Arcadia are Tripoli, Astros, Vytina, Dimitsana, Lagkadia, Tyros, Leonidio, Levidi, Megalopoli and Stemnitsa.

Ancient cities include Acacesium, Asea, Astros, Athinaio, Daseae, Falaisia (Phalesia), Gortys, Hypsus (Stemnitsa), Heraia, Lusi, Lykaio, Lycosura, Mantineia, Megalopolis, Orchomenus (Orchomenos), Tegea, Thoknia, Trapezus, Trikolonoi, Tropaia, Tripoli, Tyros, other cities includes Basilis, Caphyae, Charisia, Ellison, Enispe, Kaous, Karyes, Methydrio, Melangeia, Oryx, Paroria, Pelagos, Rhipe, Stratia, Teuthis and several more. Cities which once belonged in Arcadia include Alea (now in Argolis), Amilos (now in Achaia), and Phigalia (now in Elis).

== Economy ==
A thermoelectric power station which produces electricity for most of southern Greece, operates to the south of Megalopolis, along with a coal mine.

In agriculture, potato farms (dominant in central and northcentral Arcadia), mixed farming, olive groves, and pasture dominate the plains of Arcadia, especially in the area around Megalopolis and between Tripoli and Levidi.

== Transportation ==
The metre-gauge Corinth–Kalamata railway used to run through Arcadia until 31 January 2011, when passenger services were suspended. The main train stations of the line were in Megalopolis and Tripoli.

The main roads of Arcadia are: the A7 motorway (E65) and EO7, which both connect Tripoli with Corinth and Kalamata; the A71 and EO39 (E961), both towards Sparta; the EO33; the EO66; the EO74 towards Pyrgos; and the EO76 towards the Temple of Apollo Epicurius. In addition, the EO72 is a short airport road from Tripoli to the nearby military air base. There are also 67 numbered provincial roads, introduced in 1956 while Arcadia was a prefecture.

Arcadia has two tunnels. The Artemisio Tunnel opened first, followed by the tunnel east of Megalopolis; both serve traffic flowing between Messenia and Athens.

== News ==
- Arcadia Portal | The news site of Arcadia
- tyrostsakonia.gr
- leonidion.gr

== Television ==
- Arkadiki Radiofonia Tileorasi – ART

== Sports teams ==
- Asteras Tripolis is the Greek football club from the city of Tripoli.
- Arkadikos B.C. is the basketball team based in Tripoli, founded in 1976.

== Notable Arcadians ==
=== Mythology ===
- Lycaon, a mythical King of Arcadia
- Hermes, God of the gymnasium, public speaking, thievery, heralds and travellers.
- Pan, God of the wild, shepherds and flocks, nature of mountain wilds, hunting and rustic music, and companion of the nymphs
- Atalanta, a Greek mythic woman said to have been the daughter of the King of Arcadia

=== Ancient Arcadians ===
- Polybius (app. 200–118 BC), Greek historian of the Hellenistic Period (Megalopolis)
- Philopoemen (253–183 BC), Greek general and statesman, Achaean strategos, known as "the last of the Greeks"

=== Greek War of Independence fighters ===
- Theodoros Kolokotronis (1770–1843), Field Marshal in the Greek War of Independence (1821–1832), he was raised and lived in Arcadia (Libovisi).
- Nikitas Stamatelopoulos Nikitaras o Tourkofagos (Nikitaras the Turk-Eater) (1784–1849), Greek revolutionary, nephew of Theodoros Kolokotronis (Tourkoleka)
- Dimitris Plapoutas (1786–1864), general in the Greek War of Independence (Paloumba)
- Gennaios Kolokotronis (1803–1868), Greek revolutionary, Major General and Prime Minister of Greece (May 1862 – October 1862), son of Theodoros Kolokotronis (Stemnitsa)
- Kanellos Deligiannis (1780–1862), Greek revolutionary leader, politician and President of the Hellenic Parliament (1844–1845) (Lagkadia)

=== Politicians ===
- Alexandros Papanastasiou (1876–1936), Prime Minister of Greece (March 1924 – July 1924 and May 1932 – June 1932) and sociologist (Levidi)
- Epameinondas Deligiorgis (1829–1879), Prime Minister of Greece, lawyer (Tripoli)
- Grigoris Labrakis (1912–1963), politician, doctor (Kerasitsa)
- Theodoros Deligiannis (1820–1905), Prime Minister of Greece (Lagkadia)
- Dimitrios Gontikas (1888–1967), politician and President of the Hellenic Parliament (Magouliana)
- Dimitris Avramopoulos (1953–), Minister for Foreign Affairs (2012–), Minister of National Defence (2011–2012), Mayor of Athens (1995–2002) (Elliniko)

=== Poets ===
- Nikos Gatsos (1911–1992), (Asea)
- Kostas Karyotakis (1896–1928), (Tripoli)

=== Scientists, scholars, educators, academicians ===
- Georgios Mistriotis (1840–1916), philologist, Professor of the University of Athens (Tripoli)
- George Perlegos (1950-), Greek-American computer scientist and engineer, best known for pioneering the use of EEPROM and founding Atmel (Garea)
- Konstantinos Romaios (1874–1966), archaeologist, President of the Academy of Athens (Vourvoura)

=== Artists ===
- Mimis Fotopoulos (1913–1986), actor (Zatouna)
- Costas Gavras (1933–), director (Loutra Iraias)
- Maria Menounos (1978–), actress, television presenter, journalist (Akovo)
- Dimitris Mitropoulos, conductor and composer (Melissopetra)
- Vasilis Papakonstantinou (1950–), singer and director (Vasta)
- Kostas Tournas (1949–), singer and composer (Tripoli)
- Kostas Triantafyllopoulos (1956–2021), actor (Athinaio)
- Babis Tsertos (1956–), musician, singer (Tropaia)
- Stavros Tsiolis (1937–), director (Tripoli)
- Electros Vekris, artist / sculptor

=== Athletes ===
- Dimitrios Kourbelis (1993–), international footballer (Korakovouni)
- Yiannis Kouros (1956–), ultramarathon runner (Tripoli)
- Michail Mouroutsos (1980–), Olympic taekwondo gold medalist (Lagkadia)

=== Other notable personalities ===
- Erasmus of Arcadia, Greek Orthodox bishop
- Lakis Santas (1922–2011), Greek Resistance fighter who climbed on the Acropolis (with Manolis Glezos), on May 30, 1941, and tore down the swastika, which had been there since April 27, 1941, when the Nazi forces had entered Athens (Vytina)

== See also ==
- Polje

== General and cited references ==
- COST 621, Final Report, Groundwater Management of coastal karst aquifers, Brussels 2005.
- Ford, D. C. and Williams, P., Karst Hydrogeology and Geomorphology, Chichester, 2007, 4th, rev. ed.
- Jacobshagen, Volker (ed), Geologie von Griechenland, Beiträge zur regionalen Geologie der Erde, Stuttgart, 1986. in German/English
- Mariolakos, Ilias. Geomythological Sites and Prehistoric geotechnical and hydraulic Works in Arkadia, 12th International Congress of the Geological Society of Greece, Field Trip Guide, Patras May 2010 in Greek
- Morfis, A. (Athens), Zojer, H. (Graz). Karst Hydrogeology of the Central and Eastern Peloponnesus (Greece). Steirische Beiträge zur Hydrogeologie 37/38. 301 Seiten, Graz 1986.
- Pausanias, Description of Greece, English Translation by W.H.S. Jones + H.A. Ormerod, London, 1918.
