= Plato (mythology) =

In Greek mythology, Plato (/ˈpleɪtoʊ/ PLAY-toe; Ancient Greek: Πλάτων or Πλάτωνα Plátōn, pronounced [plá.tɔːn] means 'broad-shouldered') was an Arcadian prince as one of the 50 sons of the impious King Lycaon either by the naiad Cyllene, Nonacris or by unknown woman.

== Mythology ==
Plato and his siblings were the most nefarious and carefree of all people. To test them, Zeus visited them in the form of a peasant. These brothers mixed the entrails of a child into the god's meal, whereupon the enraged king of the gods threw the meal over the table. Plato was killed, along with his brothers and their father, by a lightning bolt of the god.
