= Peraethus =

Arcadian prince in Greek mythology

In Greek mythology, Peraethus (Ancient Greek: Περαιθεῖς means 'light up, kindle') was an Arcadian prince as one of the 50 sons of the impious King Lycaon either by the naiad Cyllene, Nonacris or by unknown woman. He was the reputed eponymous founder of the Arcadian town of Peraethenses.
