= Portheus =

Various figures in Greek mythology

In Greek mythology, Portheus (Ancient Greek: Πορθέα) may refer to various figures:

- Portheus, an Arcadian prince as one of the 50 sons of the impious King Lycaon either by the naiad Cyllene, Nonacris or by unknown woman. He and his brothers were the most nefarious and carefree of all people. To test them, Zeus visited them in the form of a peasant. These brothers mixed the entrails of a child into the god's meal, whereupon the enraged king of the gods threw the meal over the table. Portheus was killed, along with his brothers and their father, by a lightning bolt of the god.
- Portheus, also known as Porthaon, a Calydonian king and father of Oeneus.
- Portheus, father of Echion, one of the Achaeans who fought at the Trojan War.
