= Thocnia =

Ancient city of Arcadia

Coordinates: 37°25′04″N 22°04′40″E

Thocnia or Thoknia (Ancient Greek: Θωκνία), or Thocneia or Thokneia (Θώκνεια), was a town of ancient Arcadia in the district Parrhasia, situated upon a height on the river Aminius, which flows into the Helisson (the present Elissonas), a tributary of the Alpheius. The town was said to have been founded by Thocnus, a son of Lycaon, and was deserted in the time of Pausanias (2nd century), as its inhabitants had been removed to Megalopolis.

Its site is located near modern Thoknia, formerly called Bromosellas, and renamed to reflect the association with the ancient town.
