= Canethus =

Disambiguation article

In Greek mythology, the name Canethus (/kəˈniːθəs/; Ancient Greek: Κάνηθος) may refer to:

- Canethus, an Arcadian prince as one of the 50 sons of the King Lycaon either by the naiad Cyllene, Nonacris or by unknown woman. He and his siblings were the most nefarious and carefree of all people. To test them, Zeus visited them in the form of a peasant. These brothers mixed the entrails of a child into the god's meal, whereupon the enraged Zeus threw the meal over the table. Canethus was killed, along with his brothers and their father, by a lightning bolt of the god.
- Canethus, son of the Euboean Abas and father of the Argonaut Canthus, as well as eponym of a mountain near Chalcis.
- Canethus, father of the bandit Sciron or Sinis by Henioche. May or may not be the same as the above one.
