= Aegaeon (mythology) =

Mythological Greek characters

In Greek mythology, Aegaeon (Ancient Greek: Αἰγαίων, romanized: Aigaíōn, lit. 'goatish", "stormy", "Aegean') may refer to the following figures:

- Aegaeon, also called Briareus, one of the Hecatoncheires.
- Aegaeon, an Arcadian prince as one of the 50 sons of the impious King Lycaon either by the naiad Cyllene, Nonacris or by unknown woman. He and his brothers were the most nefarious and carefree of all people. To test them, Zeus visited them in the form of a peasant. These brothers mixed the entrails of a child into the god's meal, whereupon the enraged Zeus threw the meal over the table. Aegaeon was killed, along with his brothers and their father, by a lightning bolt of the god.
