= Phigalus =

In Greek mythology, Phigalus (Ancient Greek: Φίγαλος) was an Arcadian prince as one of the 50 sons of the impious King Lycaon either by the naiad Cyllene, Nonacris or by unknown woman. Otherwise, he was called an autochthon.

== Mythology ==
Phigalus was the reputed eponymous founder of the Arcadian town of Phigalia. In other account, the name of the town was derived from the dryad Phigalia. During the reign of Phialus, son of Bucolion, the town was renamed as Phialia but eventually reverted to Phigalia later.
