= Melaeneae =

Town of ancient Arcadia

Coordinates: 37°34′55″N 21°55′05″E

Melaeneae or Melaineai (Ancient Greek: Μελαινεαί), or Melaenae or Melainai (Μελαιναί), was an ancient town in the Greek region of Arcadia. Pausanias mentions that it laid on the road from Heraea to Megalopolis, 40 stadia from Buphagium. He further says that it was founded by Melaeneus, the son of Lycaon, but that it was deserted in his time and overflowed with water. However, it still features on the Tabula Peutingeriana.

The site cannot be located with certainty to this day, but it is probably close to modern-day Kephalovrisi. To the south of the village of Kokora exist ruins of ancient buildings; 19th century explorers also described the remains of a thermal bath complex to the south of the nearby village of Kakoureika which was covered in water.

Extensive archaeological research has not taken place, but an ancient quarry and Doric architectural elements have been found.
