= Carteron =

Carteron may refer to:

- Carteron murders
- Carteron (mythology)
- Patrice Carteron (born 1970), French footballer
