= Lycius =

Lycius may refer to:

- Lycius (horse)
- Lycius (mythology)
- Lycius (sculptor)
- Lycius (son of Clinis)
- Proclus Lycius
