= Eutaea =

Coordinates: 37°22′18″N 22°17′07″E

Eutaea or Eutaia (Ancient Greek: Εὔταια) was a town in the south of ancient Arcadia, in the district Maenalia, probably between Asea and Pallantium, though not on the road between these towns.

Its site is located near the modern Lianou.
