= Cromus (mythology) =

In Greek mythology, Cromus (Ancient Greek: Κρῶμος, Κρόμου or Κρώμου) may refer to two different personages:

- Cromus, an Arcadian prince as one of the 50 sons of the impious King Lycaon either by the naiad Cyllene, Nonacris or by unknown woman. The city of Cromi in Arcadia was named after him.
- Cromus, a Corinthian son of Poseidon and the eponym of Crommyon. The latter was the home of the Crommyonian Sow which was subdued by the hero Theseus.
