= Acacus (mythology) =

Greek mythology, a king of Acacesium in Arcadia

Acacus (Ancient Greek: Ἄκακος or Ἄκακον means 'harmless, guileless'), in Greek mythology, was a king of Acacesium (Ἀκακήσιον) in Arcadia. He was one of the 50 sons of the impious King Lycaon either by the naiad Cyllene, Nonacris or by unknown woman. Acacus was the foster-father of the infant Hermes.

Maia gave birth to Hermes at dawn in a sacred cave on Mount Cyllene in Arcadia, and he was raised by Acacus. He was believed to be the founder of the Arcadian town of Acacesium where he was king.
