= Stymphalus =

In Greek mythology, Stymphalus or Stymphalos (Ancient Greek: Στύμφαλος, romanized: Stúmphalos) may refer to the following personages:

- Stymphalus, an Arcadian prince as one of the 50 sons of the impious King Lycaon either by the naiad Cyllene, Nonacris or by unknown woman. He and his brothers were the most nefarious and carefree of all people. To test them, Zeus visited them in the form of a peasant. These brothers mixed the entrails of a child into the god's meal, whereupon the enraged Zeus threw the meal over the table. Stymphalus was killed, along with his brothers and their father, by a lightning bolt of the god.
- Stymphalus, king of Arcadia and son of Elatus and Laodice.
- Stymphelus (Στύμφηλος), a son of Ares and Dormothea, who threw himself into the Arcadian river Nyctimus grieving over the death of his brother Alcmaeon, whereupon the river was renamed Stymphelus after him and bore this name until it was changed to Alpheus, allegedly after a descendant of Helios who too flung himself into the river to escape prosecution by the Erinyes over the murder of his brother Cercaphus.
