= Elissonas =

Elisson or Elissonas may refer to:

- Elissonas (Arcadia), a small river Arcadia, Greece
- Elissonas (Corinthia), a small river in Corinthia, Greece
- Elissonas (Alfeios), a river in Arcadia, Greece, tributary of the Alfeios
- Elissonas, a small river near Amaliada in the western Peloponnesus
