= Heraeus (disambiguation) =

Heraeus may refer to:

- Heraeus, German tech group
- Heraeus (bug), genus of bugs
- Heraeus (mythology), son of Lycaon.
