= Dasea =

Dasea may refer to:

- Daseae, a town of ancient Arcadia, Greece
- Rough breathing, in the polytonic orthography of Ancient Greek
