= Thyraeum =

Coordinates: 37°29′20″N 22°07′19″E

Thyraeum or Thyraion (Ancient Greek: Θυραῖον) was a city in ancient Arcadia, Greece, in the district Cynuria. According to Greek mythology, it was founded by Thyraeus, a son of Lycaon. It was already ruined in the 2nd century, when it was visited by Pausanias. It was near Hypsus (present Stemnitsa), Zoetia and Paroria.

Its site is tentatively located near modern Syrna.
