= Thyraeus =

Arcadian prince in Greek mythology

In Greek mythology, Thyraeus (Ancient Greek: Θυραίου or Θυραῖόν means 'at the door') was an Arcadian prince, one of the 50 sons of the impious King Lycaon. His mother was either the naiad Cyllene, Nonacris or an unknown woman. He was the reputed eponymous founder of the Arcadian city of Thyraeum. The Arcadians believed that both Thyrea in Argolis and the Thyrean Gulf were named after Thyraeus.
