= Aliphera (Greece) =

Town of ancient Arcadia

Coordinates: 37°31′55″N 21°51′50″E

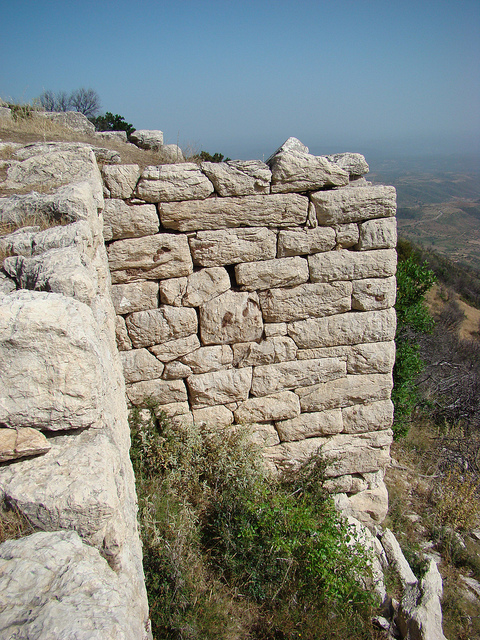
Ancient Alipheira

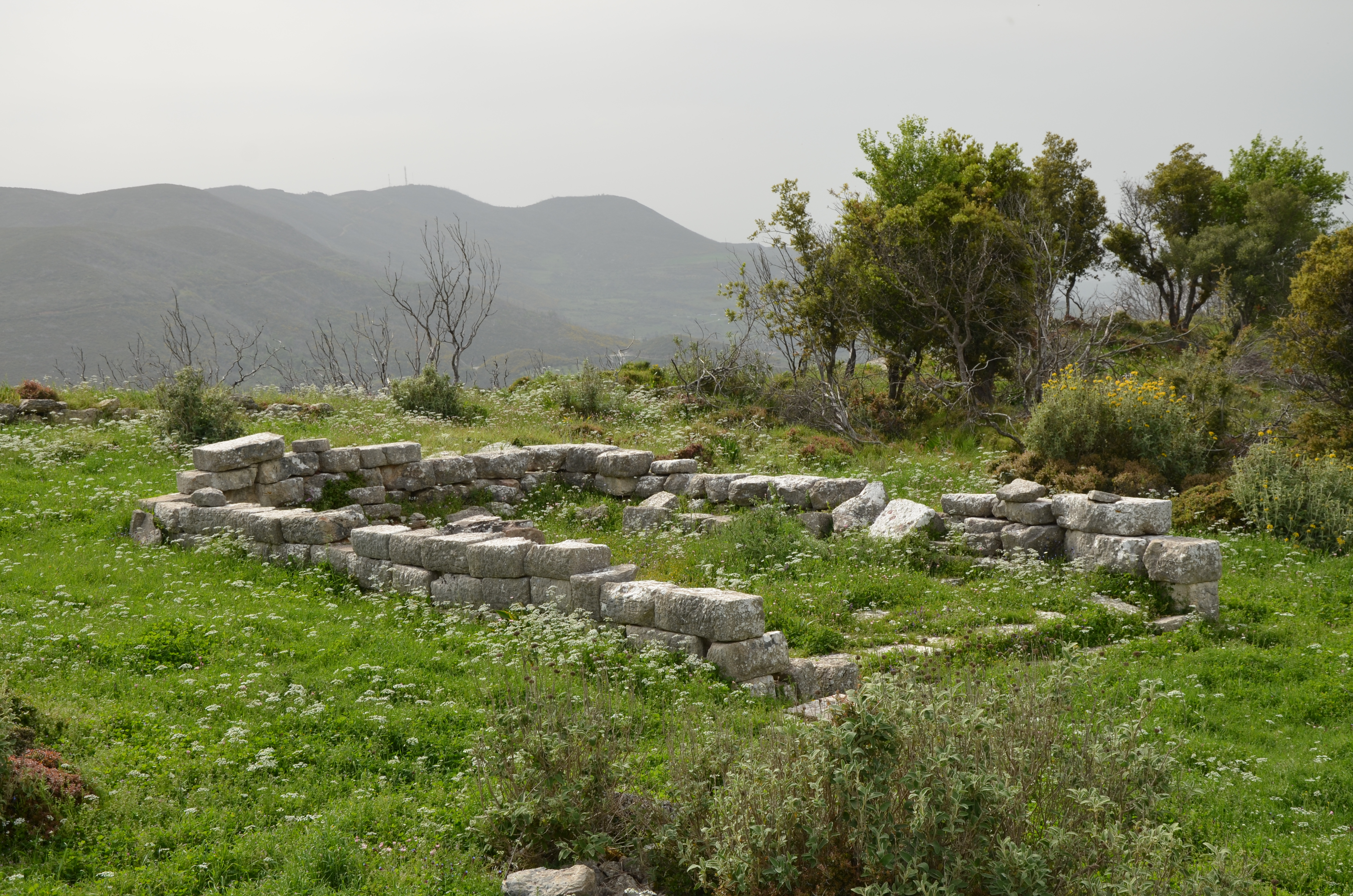
Temple of Asklepios

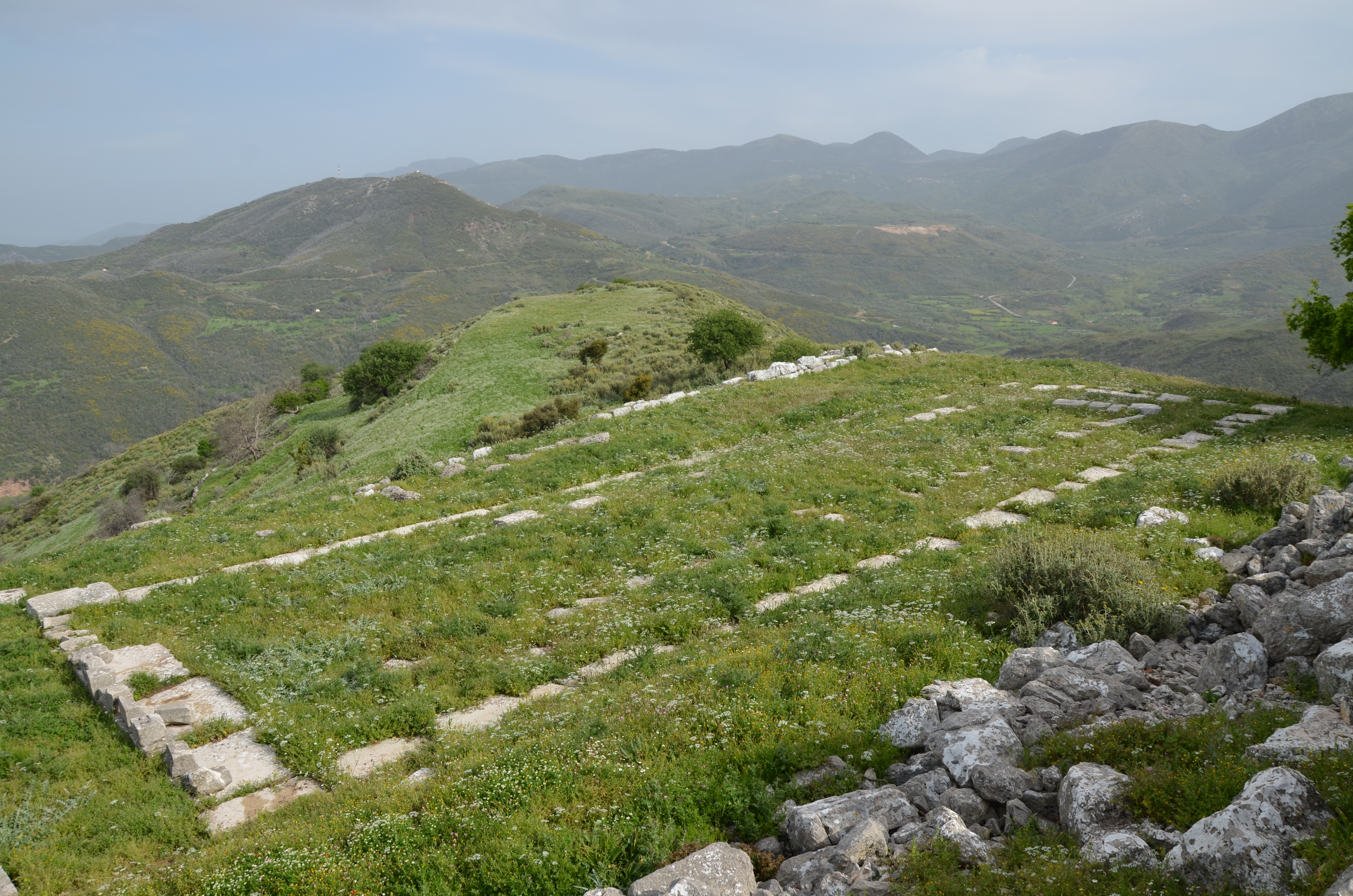
Temple of Athena

Aliphera (Ancient Greek: Ἀλίφηρα) or Alipheira (Ἀλίφειρα) was a town of ancient Arcadia, in the district Parrhasia, said to have been built by Alipherus, a son of Lycaon.

== Location ==
It was situated upon a steep and lofty hill, 40 stadia (about 8 km) south of the Alpheius, and the same distance from Heraea, and near the frontiers of Elis.

Its site is located near the modern Alifeira, which was renamed to reflect association with the ancient town.

== History ==
It was a member of the Arcadian League. A large number of its inhabitants removed to Megalopolis upon the foundation of the latter city in 371 BC; but it still continued to be a place of some importance. It was ceded to the Eleans by Lydiades, when tyrant of Megalopolis (224 BC); but it was taken from them by Philip V of Macedon in the Social War, in 219 BC after a long siege, and restored to Megalopolis. Later it joined the Achaean League and minted its own currency.

Later, the city was subject to the Romans. When Pausanias visited it in the 2nd century, the town contained temples of Asclepius and Athena, and a celebrated bronze statue by Hypatodorus of the latter goddess, who was said to have been born here.

The first excavations were done by Anastasios Orlandos in 1932. In the ancient city the temples of Athena and Asclepius, the acropolis, the cemetery wall and some buildings have been found.
