= Peucetius =

Peucetius may refer to:

- Peucetius (mythology), a son of Lycaon of Arcadia
- Streptomyces peucetius, a bacterium species
