= Lycius (mythology) =

Mythical son of Lycaon

In Greek mythology, Lycius (Ancient Greek: Λύκιος means 'dyer's buckthorn') or Lyceus was an Arcadian prince as one of the 50 sons of the impious King Lycaon either by the naiad Cyllene, Nonacris or by unknown woman. He was the possible founder of the Arcadian town of Lycoa.

== Mythology ==
Lycius and his siblings were the most nefarious and carefree of all people. To test them, Zeus visited them in the form of a peasant. These brothers mixed the entrails of a child into the god's meal, whereupon the enraged king of the gods overturned the table. Lycius was killed, along with his brothers and their father, by a lightning bolt of the god.
