= Elissonas (Arcadia) =

River in Greece

Elissonas (Greek Ελλισών ή Ελισσώνας) is a river in Greece, in the central part of the Peloponnese peninsula, in Arcadia, the right tributary of the Alfeios. It takes its source on the western slopes of the Menalon Mountains, northwest of Tripolis. It flows into Alfeios near the city of Megalopolis. Known in antiquity as Helisson. Pausanias reports that the river takes its source from the city of the same name (near the modern village of Alonistena), founded by Helisson, the son of Lycaon (king of Arcadia). From the son of Lycaon, the city and the river were named. Divided the ancient Megalopolis into two parts. Forms the gorge of Barmbutsana, also known by this name. Above the gorge between the villages of Arakhamites and Vangos there is a stone bridge of the 19th century.
