= Helisson =

Town in ancient Arcadia

Coordinates: 37°33′54″N 22°15′32″E

Helisson (Ancient Greek: Ἑλισσών) was a town in ancient Arcadia, Greece. It was situated in the district Maenalia, situated on Mount Maenalus near the territory of Mantineia, near the source of the river Helisson (present Elissonas), a tributary of the Alpheius. According to Greek mythology, the town was founded by Helisson, a son of Lycaon.

The town was taken by the Lacedaemonians in one of their wars with the Arcadians, 352 BCE; but most of its inhabitants had been previously removed to Megalopolis upon the foundation of the latter city in 371 BCE. There was a temple of Poseidon with a statue of the god. Pausanias (who visited in the 2nd century CE) found the head of the statue still remaining. The Elisphasii mentioned by Polybius are conjectured by some writers to be a corrupt form of Helissontii.

Its site is tentatively located south the modern Piana.
