= Melaeneus =

Arcadian prince in Greek mythology

In Greek mythology, Melaeneus (Ancient Greek: Μελαινέα) was an Arcadian prince as one of the 50 sons of the impious King Lycaon either by the naiad Cyllene, Nonacris or by unknown woman. He was the possible founder of the Arcadian deme of Melaenae.

== Mythology ==
Melaeneus and his siblings were the most nefarious and carefree of all people. To test them, Zeus visited them in the form of a peasant. These brothers mixed the entrails of a child into the god's meal, whereupon the enraged king of the gods threw the meal over the table. Melaeneus was killed, along with his brothers and their father, by a lightning bolt of the god.
