= Oenotrus =

Son of Lycaon in Greek mythology

In Greek mythology, Oenotrus (Ancient Greek: Οἴνωτρος, romanized: Oínōtros) was the youngest of fifty sons of Lycaon from Arcadia. Together with his brother Peucetius (Πευκέτιος), he migrated to the Italian Peninsula, dissatisfied because of the division of Peloponnesus among the fifty brothers by their father Lycaon. According to the Greek and Roman traditions, this was the first expedition dispatched from Greece to found a colony, long before the Trojan War. He was the likely eponym of Oenotria (Οἰνωτρία), giving his name to the Italian peninsula, especially the Southern Pass (modern Calabria).
