= Mainalo =

Mountain of the Peloponnese

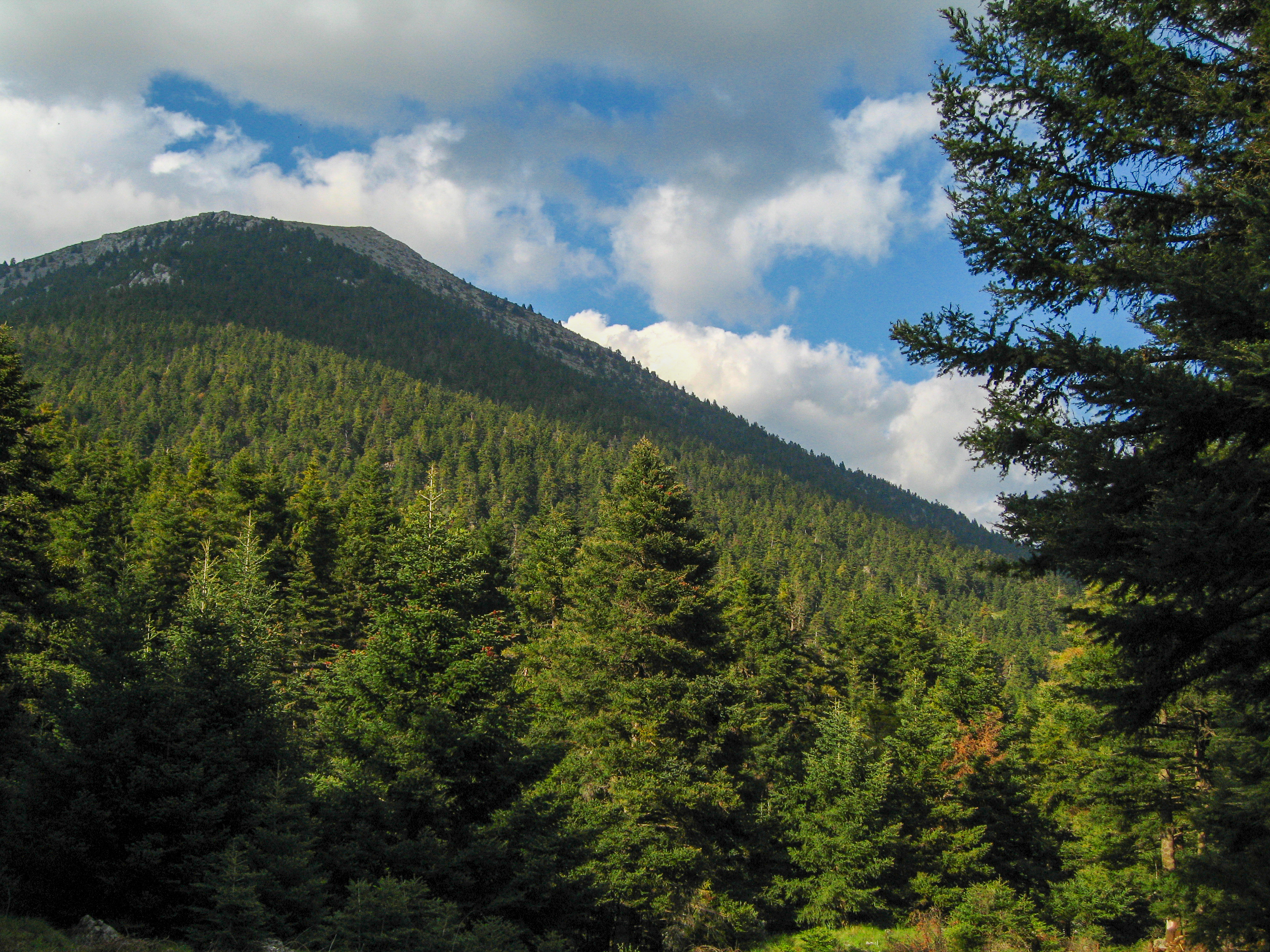
- Greek fir forest on Mainalo

Highest point
- Peak: Ostrakina or Profitis Ilias
- Elevation: 1,981 m (6,499 ft)
- Prominence: 1,216 m (3,990 ft)
- Listing: World Ribus
- Coordinates: 37.6436°N 22.2797°E

Naming
- Etymology: from Ancient Greek Μαίναλον (Maínalon)
- Native name: Μαίναλο (Greek)

Geography
- Location within Peloponnese
- Location: The mountain is in the middle of the Peloponnese, in Arcadia, Greece

Geology
- Mountain type: Mount

Climbing
- Easiest route: Hike

Mainalo (Greek: Μαίναλο, Ancient Greek: Μαίναλος, Μαίναλον, romanized: Mainalos, Mainalon; Latin: Maenalus) is the tallest mountain in the Menalon highlands of the Peloponnese, and is located in Arcadia.

The mountain's highest point, known as both Profitis Ilias and Ostrakina, at a height of 1,981 m (6,499 ft), is the highest point in Arcadia. The mountain has a length of 15 to 20 kilometres (9.3 to 12.4 mi) from southwest of Tripoli to northeast of Vytina, and a width of 5 to 10 kilometres (3.1 to 6.2 mi) from Zygovisti to Kapsas. The mountain is part of a Natura 2000 site, designated in March 2011, covering an area of 226.4 square kilometres (87.4 mi^{2}). In the 19th and early 20th century, the mountain was known as Apano Chrepa.

While the mountain takes its name from the ancient Mount Mainalos, and the ancient city of Maenalus which stood at its summit, modern scholars now identify the location of the ancient mountain as "Ágios Ilías", a mountain 25 kilometres (16 mi) further south near the town of Asea. The name was likely mistakenly connected to the mountain now known as Mainalo by earlier European travelers. According to ancient Greek mythology, Mount Mainalos got its name from Maenalus, son of Lykaon, king of Arcadia, and in antiquity the mountain was especially sacred to Pan.

Mainalo is home to a ski resort, which is found at an elevation of 1,600 metres (5,200 ft), with 7 ski slopes and 4 lifts, which are at an altitude between 1,550 to 1,770 metres (5,090 to 5,810 ft).

== Climate ==
Below the data of the National Observatory of Athens station in the doline of Kehroti in Mainalo.

Climate data for Kehroti Mainalo (1.613 m a.s.l.) Climate: Humid continental climate (Dfb)
Month	Jan	Feb	Mar	Apr	May	Jun	Jul	Aug	Sep	Oct	Nov	Dec	Year
Record high °C (°F)	11.4 (52.5)	14.6 (58.3)	14.3 (57.7)	20.7 (69.3)	26.7 (80.1)	27.1 (80.8)	32.1 (89.8)	37.4 (99.3)	26.5 (79.7)	25.0 (77.0)	16.7 (62.1)	14.3 (57.7)	37.4 (99.3)
Mean daily maximum °C (°F)	1.9 (35.4)	2.9 (37.2)	5.5 (41.9)	10.2 (50.4)	14.8 (58.6)	19.6 (67.3)	22.9 (73.2)	23.4 (74.1)	19.1 (66.4)	13.7 (56.7)	8.7 (47.7)	4.3 (39.7)	12.2 (54.1)
Daily mean °C (°F)	−4.0 (24.8)	−2.1 (28.2)	−0.2 (31.6)	4.1 (39.4)	7.8 (46.0)	11.3 (52.3)	13.3 (55.9)	14.9 (58.8)	10.9 (51.6)	6.5 (43.7)	2.8 (37.0)	−0.5 (31.1)	5.4 (41.7)
Mean daily minimum °C (°F)	−9.8 (14.4)	−7.1 (19.2)	−5.9 (21.4)	−2.0 (28.4)	0.7 (33.3)	2.9 (37.2)	3.7 (38.7)	6.3 (43.3)	2.7 (36.9)	−0.8 (30.6)	−3.2 (26.2)	−5.2 (22.6)	−1.5 (29.4)
Record low °C (°F)	−35.3 (−31.5)	−26.9 (−16.4)	−27.7 (−17.9)	−14.3 (6.3)	−7.2 (19.0)	−4.5 (23.9)	−4.4 (24.1)	−3.2 (26.2)	−12.1 (10.2)	−16.3 (2.7)	−17.9 (−0.2)	−27.4 (−17.3)	−35.3 (−31.5)
Average rainfall mm (inches)	148.0 (5.83)	105.3 (4.15)	119.8 (4.72)	92.3 (3.63)	90.1 (3.55)	30.1 (1.19)	42.3 (1.67)	55.4 (2.18)	64.0 (2.52)	124.0 (4.88)	125.4 (4.94)	147.9 (5.82)	1,144.6 (45.08)
Source: National Observatory of Athens (Dec 2010 – Dec 2022)

== Geography ==
Mainalo's ground is primarily made of lime, among various calcareous substrates.

Mainalo has various named peaks. Listed by height, they are, among others;

- Ostrakina (Greek: Οστρακίνα) or Profitis Ilias (Greek: Προφήτης Ηλιας) at 1,981 metres (6,499 ft)
- Pateritsa (Greek: Πατερίτσα) at 1,875 metres (6,152 ft)
- Aidini (Greek: Αϊδίνη) at 1,849 metres (6,066 ft)
- Mavri Koryfi (Greek: Μαύρη Κορυφή) at 1,818 metres (5,965 ft)
- Mourtzia (Greek: Μουρτζιά) at 1,794 metres (5,886 ft)
- Mesovouni (Greek: Μεσοβούνι) at 1,730 metres (5,680 ft)
- Krevatia (Greek: Κρεββάτια) at 1,563 metres (5,128 ft)
- Epano Chrepa (Greek: Επάνω χρέπα) at 1,559 metres (5,115 ft)
- Lioritsi (Greek: Λιορίτσι) at 1,155 metres (3,789 ft)
- Sterna (Greek: Στέρνα) at 1,071 metres (3,514 ft)

The record low temperature of −35.3 °C (−31.5 °F) was registered on 17 January 2012 in Mainalo sinkhole.

== Ecology ==
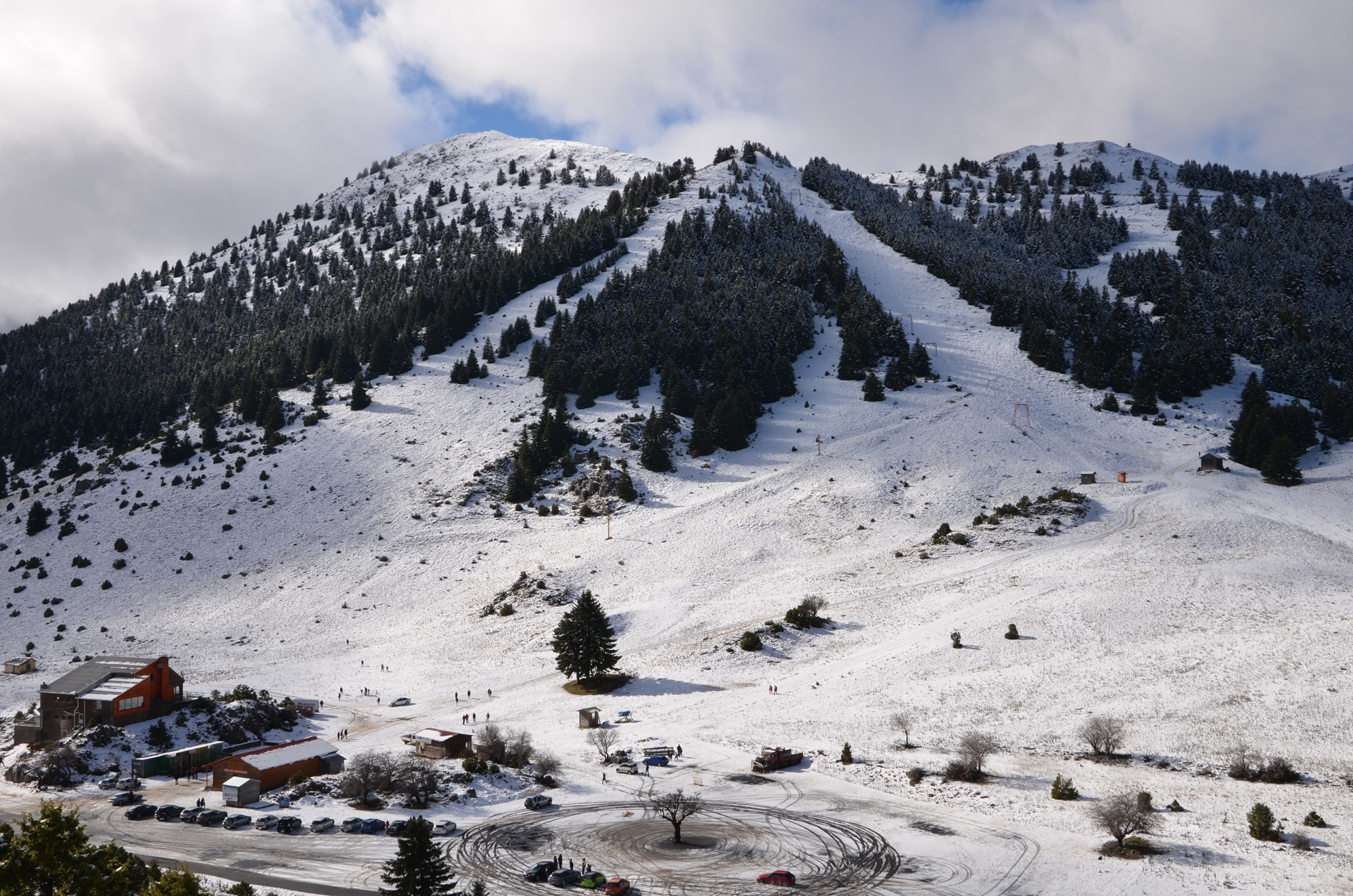
Ostrakina Ski Center in winter

The mountain houses many forests of Greek fir and Crimean pine. Natura 2000 cites these forests as the "[Greek fir and Crimean pine's] best representation in Peloponnisos."

Mainalo has several ecological environments, comprising:

- Mediterranean arborescent matorrals, covering 8.96 square kilometres (3.46 mi^{2}) of the mountain, this environment consists of Mediterranean and sub-Mediterranean sclerophyllous evergreen shrublands grouped under arborescent junipers.^{:59}
- Endemic oro-Mediterranean heaths with gorse, covering 5.57 square kilometres (2.15 mi^{2}) of the mountain, this environment consists of a dry mountainous environment. Mediterranean heaths are usually dominated by Genista, while containing various other, often spined, shrubs like Acantholimon, Astragalus, Erinacea, Bupleurum, Ptilotrichum, Echinospartum, and Anthyllis. This environment also includes a variety of Asteraceae and Lamiaceae.^{:53}
- Calcareous rocky slopes with chasmophytic vegetation, covering 0.22 square kilometres (0.085 mi^{2}) of the mountain, this environment consists of limestone cliffs and screes, featuring great ecological diversity, with many endemic plants growing in fissures within rock.^{:96}

Many amphibians, reptiles, mammals, insects, and diurnal predatory birds inhabit Mainalo. These include, among others;

- Reptiles such as the Balkan whip snake, marginated tortoise, Kotschy's gecko, Greek rock lizard, Peloponnese wall lizard, European copper skink, and the horned viper.
- Mammals such as the European hare, beech marten, European badger, lesser noctule bat, edible dormouse, Thomas's pine vole, and the western broad-toothed field mice.
- Amphibians such as the European green toad, European tree frog, and the Syrian spadefoot.
- Birds such as the northern goshawk, Eurasian sparrowhawk, common buzzard, common kestrel, and the peregrine falcon.
- Insects such as the Kretania sephirus butterfly, Persian skipper butterfly, eastern orange tip butterfly and the mountain small white butterfly.
