= Menephron =

Mythological man from Arcadia

In Greek and Roman mythology, Menephron (Ancient Greek: Μενέφρων, romanized: Menéphrōn) is the name of an Arcadian man notable for his tale surrounding incest. He is only referenced briefly in the works of Roman authors Ovid and Hyginus.

== Mythology ==
In Ovid's Metamorphoses, as the runaway Medea flies above Greece in the chariot her grandfather gave her, she passes over Mount Cyllene, where Menephron would incestously lie with his mother in an animal-like manner.

Hyginus in Fabulae confirms that Menephron slept with his mother, here named Blias/Bliade, and adds that he also slept with his daughter Cyllene as well.

== See also ==
- Aegypius
- Epopeus
- Jocasta
- Nyctaea

== Bibliography ==
- Anderson, William S. (1972). Ovid's Metamorphoses: Books 6-10. University of Oklahoma Press. ISBN 0-8061-1456-8.
- Hyginus, Gaius Julius, The Myths of Hyginus. Edited and translated by Mary A. Grant, Lawrence: University of Kansas Press, 1960.
- Ovid (1916). Metamorphoses. Loeb Classical Library 42. Vol. I: Books 1-8. Translated by Frank Justus Miller, revised by G. P. Goold. Cambridge, MA: Harvard University Press.
- Pavlock, Barbara (May 21, 2009). The Image of the Poet in Ovid's Metamorphoses. England: University of Wisconsin Press. ISBN 978-0-299-23140-8.
- Smith, William (1873). A Dictionary of Greek and Roman Biography and Mythology. London, UK: John Murray, printed by Spottiswoode and Co., New-Street Square and Parliament Street.
