= Parrhasia (Arcadia) =

Historic region in Greece

Parrhasia (Greek: Παρρασία) was a region in south Arcadia, Greece. Parrhasius, son of Lycaon gave it his name.

Today, the area corresponds to modern southwestern Arcadia, west of Megalopoli, and southeastern Elis. The nymph of Artemis named Callisto, whom the goddess Hera made into a bear and Zeus later made into the constellation Ursa Major, was said to come from Parrhasia. Athenaios mentions a famous beauty contest there.

== Ancient cities ==
- Acacesium
- Acontium
- Aliphera
- Basilis
- Daseae
- Lycosura
- Macareae
- Parrhasia
- Phigalia — in Parrhasia, but in an isolated area on the frontier of the Messenia region, which had access to the sea and whose causes they often joined.
- Proseis
- Trapezus
