= Maenalus (mythology) =

Arcadian prince in Greek mythology

In Greek mythology, Maenalus (Ancient Greek: Μαίναλον or Μαίναλος Mainalos) was an Arcadian prince as one of the 50 sons of the impious King Lycaon either by the naiad Cyllene, Nonacris or by unknown woman. He was the founder of Maenalus which was the most famous of the cities of Arcadia in ancient times.

== Mythology ==
Mainalos and his siblings were the most nefarious and carefree of all people. To test them, Zeus visited them in the form of a peasant. These brothers mixed the entrails of a child into the god's meal, whereupon the enraged king of the gods threw the meal over the table. Maenalus was killed, along with his brothers and their father, by a lightning bolt of the god.
