= Acacesium =

Coordinates: 37°23′N 22°03′E

Acacesium or Akakesion (Ancient Greek: Ἀκακήσιον), was a town of ancient Arcadia in the district of Parrhasia, at the foot of a hill of the same name, and 36 stadia on the road from Megalopolis to Phigalea. It is said to have been founded by Acacus, son of Lycaon; and according to some traditions, Hermes was brought up at this place by Acacus, and hence derived the surname of Acacesius. Upon the hill there was a statue in stone, in the time of Pausanias, of Hermes Acacesius; and four stadia from the town was a celebrated temple of Despoena. This temple probably stood on the hill, on which are now the remains of the church of St Elias.

Its site is located near modern Daseiai.
