= Hypsus =

Coordinates: 37°33′18″N 22°04′52″E

Hypsus or Hypsous (Ancient Greek: Ὑψοῦς), also known as Hypsuntus or Hypsountos (Ὑψοῦντος), was a town of ancient Arcadia, in the district Cynuria, situated upon a mountain of the same name. According to Greek mythology, it was said to have been founded by Hypsus, a son of Lycaon.

Its site is located near the modern Stemnitsa.
