= Maenalus (Arcadia) =

Town of ancient Arcadia, Greece

Coordinates: 37°32′58″N 22°15′57″E

Maenalus or Mainalos (Ancient Greek: Μαίναλος) was a town of ancient Arcadia, and the capital of the district Maenalia (Μαιναλία), which formed part of the territory of Megalopolis upon the foundation of the latter city. Maenalus was in ruins in the time of Pausanias, who mentions a temple of Athena, a stadium, and a hippodrome, as belonging to the place.

According to the myth it was founded by Maenalus, son of Lycaon.

Its site is tentatively located near the modern Davia.

== Notable people ==
- Androsthenes of Maenalus, a pankratiast who won gold in the ancient Olympic Games in 420 and 416 BC.^{:27}^{:10}
- Damoxenidas of Maenalus, a boxer who won gold in the ancient Olympic Games in 384 BC.^{:159}^{:246}
- Ephotion of Maenalus, a pankratiast who won gold in the ancient Olympic Games in 464 BC.^{:60}
- Euthymenes of Maenalus, a boys' and adult wrestler who won gold in the ancient Olympic Games in 400 and 392 BC.^{:66}
- Nicodamus of Maenalus, a sculptor who made statues of ancient Olympic victors and Greek mythological figures.
- Phormis of Maenalus, a distinguished fighter who became rich in service of Gelo.
- Xenocles of Maenalus, a boys' wrestler who won gold in the ancient Olympic Games in 372 BC.^{:177}
