= Lycaon (king of Arcadia) =

Greek mythical character, king of Arcadia, son of Pelasgus and Meliboea

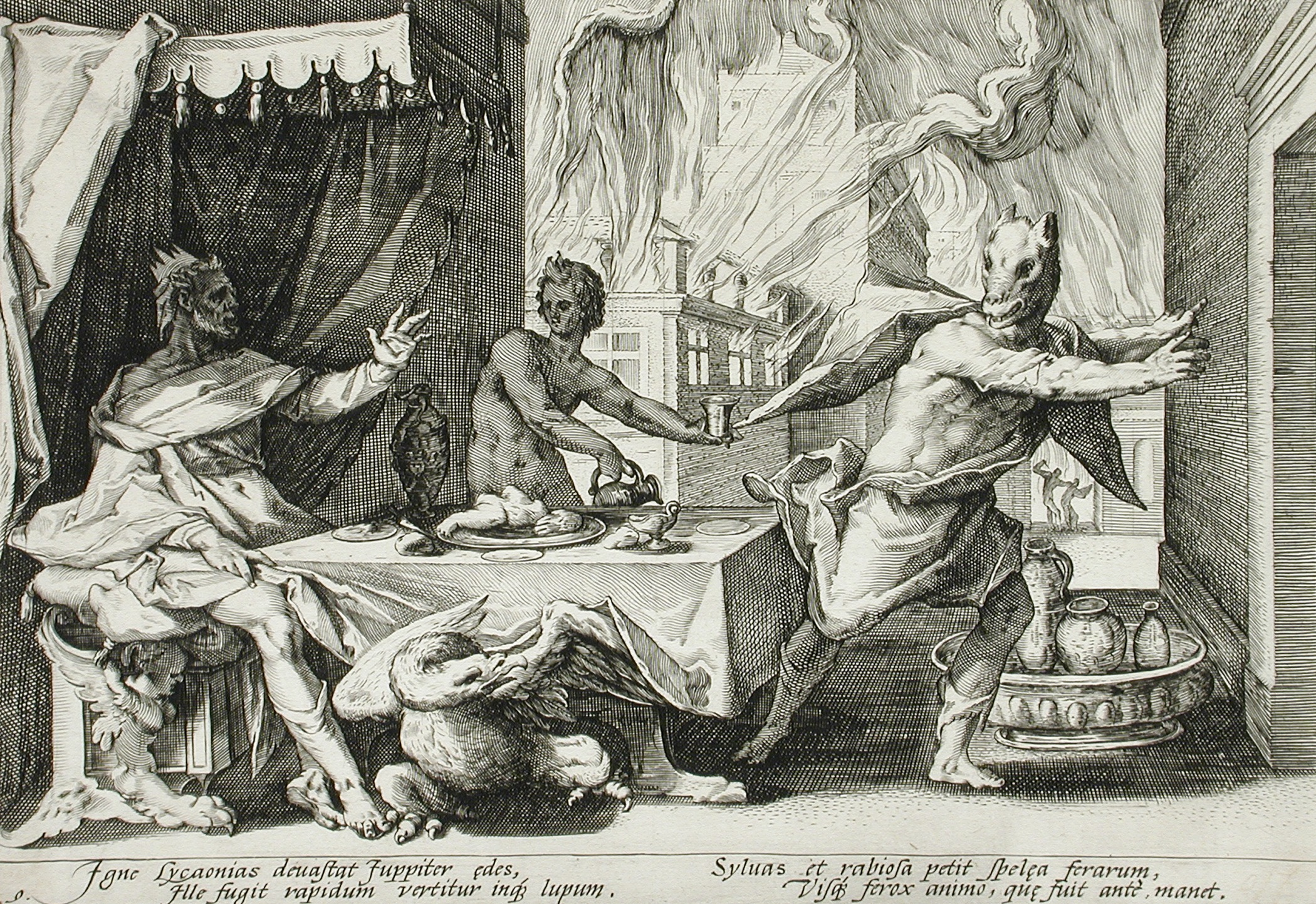
Zeus turning Lycaon into a wolf; engraving by Hendrik Goltzius.

In Greek mythology, Lycaon (/laɪˈkeɪɒn/; Attic Greek: Λυκάων, romanized: Lukáōn, Attic Greek: [ly.kǎː.ɔːn]) was a king of Arcadia who, in the most popular version of the myth, killed and cooked his son Nyctimus and served him to Zeus, to see whether the god was sufficiently all-knowing to recognize human flesh. Disgusted, Zeus transformed Lycaon into a wolf, while Nyctimus was restored to life.

Though notorious for his horrific deed, Lycaon was also remembered as a culture hero. He was believed to have founded the city Lycosura, to have established a cult of Zeus Lycaeus and to have started the tradition of the Lycaean Games, which Pausanias thinks were older than the Panathenaic Games. According to Gaius Julius Hyginus (d. AD 17), Lycaon dedicated the first temple to Hermes of Cyllene.

== Family ==
Lycaon was the son of Pelasgus and either the Oceanid Meliboea or Deianira, daughter of an elder Lycaon. His wife was called Cyllene, an Oread nymph who gave her name to Mount Cyllenê though sometimes she was regarded as his mother instead. Other accounts give the name of his wife as Nonacris, after whom an Arcadian town may have been named. Lycaon was also known to have had at least three daughters: Callisto, Dia, and Psophis.

=== Sons of Lycaon ===
According to the Bibliotheca (Pseudo-Apollodorus), Lycaon has 50 sons. An alternate list of Lycaon's sons is given by Pausanias. According to his account, almost each of them founded a city in Arcadia and became its eponym.

List of Lycaon's sons
Name	Apollodorus		Pausanias	Others	Notes
Acacus			✓		foster-father of Hermes; founded Acacesium
Acontes	1	✓			
Aegaeon	2	✓			
Alipherus	3	✓	✓		founded Aliphera
Ancyor	4	✓			
Archebates	5	✓			
Aseatas			✓		founded Asea
Bucolion	6	✓			
Canethus	7	✓			
Carteron	8	✓			
Caucon	9	✓		✓	eponym of the Caucones that were believed to have settled in Triphylia
Ceteus				✓	father of Callisto or Megisto
Charisius			✓		founded Charisia
Cleitor	10	✓		✓	possibly eponym of Cleitor
Coretho	11	✓			
Cromus			✓		founded Cromi
Cynaethus	12	✓			
Daseatas			✓		founded Dasea
Eleuther				✓	stayed aside from the abomination
Euaemon	13	✓			possibly eponym of Euaemon
Eumetes	14	✓			
Eumon	15	✓			
Genetor	16	✓			
Haemon	17	✓		✓	possibly eponym of Haemoniae
Harpaleus	18	✓			
Harpalycus	19	✓			
Helix	20	✓			
Helisson			✓		founded the town of Helisson (also gave his name to a nearby river)
Heraeus	21	✓	✓		founded Heraea
Hopleus	22	✓			
Horus	23	✓			
Hyperes				✓	founded Hyperesia
Hypsus			✓		founded Hypsus
Lebadus				✓	stayed aside from the abomination
Leo(n)	24	✓			
Linus	25	✓			
Lycius	26	✓	✓(possibly)	✓	founded Lycoa
Macareus	27	✓	✓		founded Macaria
Macednus	28	✓			founded Macedonia
Maenalus	29	✓	✓	✓	founded Maenalus
Mantineus	30	✓	✓	✓	founded Mantinea
Mecisteus	31	✓			
Melaeneus	32	✓	✓ (possibly)		founded Melaeneae
Nyctimus	33	✓	✓	✓	succeeded to Lycaon's power
Oenotrus			✓	✓	the youngest, founded Oenotria in Italy
Orchomenus	34	✓	✓	✓	founded Orchomenus and Methydrium
Orestheus			✓		founded Oresthasium
Pallas	35	✓	✓		founded Pallantium
Parrhasius				✓	founded Parrhasia and said to be the father of Arcas
Peraethus			✓		founded Peraetheis
Peucetius	36	✓			
Phassus	37	✓			
Phigalus			✓		founded Phigalia
Phineus	38	✓			
Phthius	39	✓		✓	possibly eponym of Phthiotis
Physius	40	✓			
Plato(n)	41	✓			
Polichus	42	✓			
Portheus	43	✓			
Prothous	44	✓			
Socleus	45	✓			
Stymphalus	46	✓		✓	possibly eponym of the town Stymphalus
Teleboas	47	✓		✓	
Tegeates			✓		founded Tegea
Thesprotus	48	✓		✓	founded Thesprotia
Thocnus			✓		founded Thocnia
Thyraeus			✓		founded Thyraeum
Titanas	49	✓			
Trapezeus			✓		founded Trapezus
Tricolonus			✓		founded Tricoloni

== Mythology ==
There are several versions of the Lycaon myth already reported by Hesiod (Fragmenta astronomica, by Eratosthenes, Catasterismi), told by several authors. The most popular version is the one reported by Ovid in the first book of his Metamorphoses.

The different versions of the myth are as follows:

- According to the Bibliotheca, Lycaon had sired 50 sons with many wives. These sons were the most nefarious and carefree of all people. To test them, Zeus visited them in the form of a peasant. They mixed the entrails of a child into the god's meal, whereupon the enraged Zeus threw the meal over the table, which explains the name of the city Trapezus (from τραπέζι, table), and killed Lycaon and his sons with lightning. Only the youngest son, Nyctimus, was saved due to the intervention of Gaia.
- John Tzetzes records two similar versions which agree with Apollodorus's account; one mentions that the idea to serve Zeus a slaughtered child belonged to Maenalus, one of Lycaon's sons, while the other makes Nyctimus the victim.
- According to Pausanias, Lycaon was instantly transformed into a wolf after sacrificing a child on the altar of Zeus and sprinkling the blood on the altar.
- According to Lycophron, all were transformed into wolves for having devoured Nyctimus. Lycophron extends the characteristics of Lycaon and his sons onto all the Arcadians.
- The version recounted in the Fabulae is basically the same as that of Pseudo-Apollodorus. De astronomia describes the victim of Lycaon as being Arcas, son of Jupiter (Zeus) and Callisto, the daughter of Lycaon. Restored to life, Arcas was brought up to be a hunter. His mother was subsequently transformed into a bear, whom Arcas pursued without realizing her true identity; they strayed into a temple where entrance was punished by death. Zeus saved them both by turning them into the constellations Arctophylax and Ursa Major, the Great Bear. Both these works are attributed to different authors named Hyginus; whether one of them was Gaius Julius Hyginus is disputed.
- Nicolaus Damascenus tells that Lycaon's sons were nefarious. To test Zeus, they mixed the flesh of a boy into the sacrifices, whereupon all who were present during the murder of the child were killed by lightning.
- According to Ovid, Lycaon mistrusted and derided the signs of Zeus's divine nature which the god openly demonstrated upon arrival to Arcadia. Determined to find out whether the guest was truly a god or a mortal, Lycaon served Zeus the flesh of a prisoner, partly cooked and partly roasted. Moreover, in his quest to test Zeus's immortality, Lycaon attempted to murder the god while he slept. Thereupon, Zeus brought the roof down and transformed the fleeing Lycaon into a wolf.
- According to the dictionary Suda, Lycaon had diligently been guarding the laws established by his father for the Arcadian people. In order to keep his subjects from injustice, he would tell them that Zeus frequented his home in the guise of a mortal man so as to keep watch over how lawful the humans were. One day, when he was about to perform a sacrifice, the people were eager to know if the god was present; to find out if Lycaon told them the truth about Zeus's visits, they killed one of the king's fifty sons and mixed him in with the sacrificial meat, whereupon all of them were killed by lightning.
- According to Eratosthenes, Lycaon butchered his grandson (that is, Arcas), who was put together again by Zeus and placed upon the constellations, whereas Lycaon's house was struck by a thunderbolt.

In some versions of the myth, the victim is thus Lycaon's grandson or an unidentified child, boy, or prisoner. Some variants say that, instead of Lycaon himself, it was his sons who decided to test Zeus in this way.

== See also ==
- Child cannibalism
- Damarchus
- Lykaia
- Tantalus
- Werewolf (lycanthropy)
