= Melangeia =

Coordinates: 37°38′33″N 22°25′00″E

Melangeia (Ancient Greek: Μελαγγεῖα) was a place in ancient Arcadia, northeast of the town Mantineia, on one of the roads to Argos. From Melangeia, an aqueduct led to Mantineia.

Its location corresponds with that of the modern village Pikernis.
