= Lycoa =

Coordinates: 37°31′N 22°17′E

Lycoa or Lykoa (Ancient Greek: Λυκόα), was a town in ancient Arcadia in the district Maenalia, at the foot of Mount Maenalus, with a temple of Artemis Lycoatis. It was in ruins in the time of Pausanias (2nd century).

Its site is tentatively located south of the modern Davia.
