= Carteron murders =

Unsolved French family murders

The Carteron murders refers to the killing of a family of peasant farmers on their farm near Bommiers, in the département of Indre in central France, on 21 July 1946. The murders were evidently motiveless and remain unsolved.

== The murders ==
On the morning of Thursday 25 July 1946, Mrs Jeanne Jugand, the 35-year-old neighbour of the Carterons, became concerned as she had not seen the family for several days. She went to their farm, which was 100 metres from her own house, and saw worrying signs through the window. Mrs Jugand's husband then alerted the mayor and the police in Ambrault. The prosecutor's office in Châteauroux requested the assistance of the judicial police in Limoges. Several senior police officers and inspectors were dispatched to the scene. A locksmith broke open the door. The scene inside resembled an execution. The bodies of Kléber Carteron, his wife Alphonsine, their son André and another boy, Claude Godard, a ward of the state, were found face down with their arms and legs bound, all executed with a bullet to the back of the head. The family dog had also been killed in its basket.

== Investigation ==
Six spent cartridges and two unspent ones were found at the crime scene. The police's report emphasised the farm's relatively isolated location, described the three rooms and mentioned: "The door to the room where the crime was committed was locked. The key had been removed and could not be found. [...] The window had a smashed pane..."

Despite the disorder in the room and the fact that the cupboards had been ransacked, there were no signs of a struggle. Detectives were initially unable to determine the type of weapon that had fired the bullets. A gunsmith could only confirm that the six cartridges came from the same weapon. It was not until two years later that it was established that the weapon had been a Sten sub-machine gun.

A motive of robbery seemed unlikely because the family were very poor. For a while, the authorities investigated a theory that the crime was committed by a legionnaire acquaintance of Kléber Carteron who was inflicting personal revenge. However, this theory was dismissed as the legionnaire had been in Algeria at the time of the murders.

With nothing else to go on, the investigators were left to rely on questioning the local population. Local working-class people were reluctant to talk to the authorities. Several theories were suggested but yielded no leads.

New evidence arose when a farm worker, employed along with Kléber Carteron at the Ferme des Paisseaux farm, stated that Carteron had been scared the previous winter. On two occasions, Carteron confided in his colleague that he had been followed along the track that led to his home. A few hundred metres away, close to a public forest, a bag was found which belonged to Carteron and contained a schoolbook. Eleven days later, a lumberjack came across a makeshift shelter in the forest. This made it possible to establish a link between the crime scene, the place where the bag was found and the shelter, all of which were located within a few fields' distance of each other.

At the same time, a local rumour was circulating. Some believed that Kléber Carteron, who enjoyed poaching in his spare time, had surprised members of the French Resistance who were appropriating something that had been airdropped into the forest during the Second World War. A Sten sub-machine gun was a weapon commonly used by the Resistance. However, no concrete evidence was found to support this theory, which also lacked an explanation for why the resistance members would later have gone to Carteron's house to kill the whole family, instead of just killing him on the spot.

In April 1947, a final report from Superintendent Daraud closed the case for the time being, without being able to find a motive or a suspect.

== New investigation ==
In 1948, the investigation was left in the hands of the Orléans police department, led by René Rolland. A Sten sub-machine gun was found at the home of a "Captain Jacques", an individual with a dubious local reputation. During the war, he had led a network of Resistance fighters, known as the Armée secrète ("Secret Army"), in the Issoudun region. A professor specializing in weapons confirmed that a Sten had fired the bullets but, for some reason, the professor was never shown the weapon found in the possession of "Captain Jacques". It is still unknown whether any ballistic analysis was ever carried out. With this, the investigation was once again closed in December 1948.

Among the local population today, a personal dispute between Kléber Carteron and the unknown killer is the theory given most credit. It is widely acknowledged that the investigation had many shortcomings and not all the details were examined thoroughly, or at all. This has been attributed to the general turmoil and lack of stability in French society immediately after the end of the Second World War.

== See also ==
- List of unsolved murders (1900–1979)
