= Peraetheis =

Town in ancient Arcadia on the river Elaphus

Coordinates: 37°26′13″N 22°14′13″E

Peraetheis or Peraitheis (Ancient Greek: Περαιθεῖς), or Peraethea or Peraithea, was a town in ancient Arcadia, in the district Maenalia on the river Elaphus.

Its site is located near the modern Arachamites.
