= Heraea (Arcadia) =

Town in ancient Arcadia

Coordinates: 37°36′43″N 21°51′23″E

Heraea or Heraia (Ancient Greek: Ἡραία) was the most important town of ancient Arcadia on the Lower Alpheius. It was situated near the frontiers of Elis, and on the high road from Arcadia to Olympia. Its territory was called the Heraeatis or Heraiatis (Ἡραιᾶτις).

== History ==
According to Greek mythology it was said to have been founded by Heraeus, a son of Lycaon, and to have been called originally Sologorgus. At an early period the Heraeans concluded a treaty with the Eleians for mutual protection and support for one hundred years; the original of which treaty, engraved on a bronze tablet in the old Peloponnesian dialect, was brought from Olympia, and is now in the British Museum. This treaty is placed about the 50th Olympiad, or 580 BCE, since it belongs to a time when the Eleians exercised an undisputed supremacy over the dependent districts of Pisatis and Triphylia; and the Heraeans consequently were anxious to avail themselves of their support.

Heraea was, at that time, the chief village among eight others which lay scattered upon the banks of the Alpheius and its tributaries the Ladon and Erymanthus; but the inhabitants of these separate villages were transferred to Heraea, and a city there was founded by the Spartan king Cleombrotus I or Cleonymus. In consequence of their close connection with Sparta, the Heraeans incurred the hostility of the other Arcadians, who laid waste their territory in 370 BCE. At a later time Heraea was a member of the Achaean League; and, as Elis was one of the chief places of the Aetolian League, it is frequently mentioned in the contests between these two powers. It was afterwards in the hands of Philip V of Macedon, but it was restored to the Achaeans. Heraea is mentioned by Strabo as one of the deserted cities of Arcadia; but when it was visited by Pausanias, it was still a place of some importance. The latter writer describes its temples, baths, plantations of myrtles and other trees along the banks of the Alpheius: among its temples he mentions two sacred to Dionysus, one to Pan, and another to Hera, of the latter of which only some ruins were left.

== Location ==
Heraea is located on the Alpheios river near Agios Ioannis, a few miles south-west of the modern village of Loutra Iraias, in the municipality of Gortynia in the western Peloponnese, Greece. The modern municipal unit of Iraia is named after it.

The site of Heraea is fixed by its distance from the mouth of the Ladon, which, according to Pausanias, was 15 stadia. The same writer says that the greater part of the city lay upon a gently sloping hill, and the remainder upon the banks of the Alpheius.

Heraea was favourably situated in several respects. Its territory was fertile, and it was situated on the high road from Olympia into the interior of Arcadia. From the north of Arcadia a road led into the valley of the Alpheius, near Heraea; and two roads led into the Heraeatis, one from Megalopolis, and the other from Messene and Phigalia, which joined the former close to the town. There was a bridge over the Alpheius close to Heraea, which Philip restored in 219 BCE. The Heraeatis was separated from Pisatis by the river Erymanthus, and from the territory of Megalopolis by the river Buphagus. The famous Tabula Peutingeriana shows a road system connecting Heraia with ancient Olympia, Melaneae and Megalopolis.

The wine of Heraea was celebrated in antiquity, and was said to make women fruitful.

== Archaeology ==
The remains of Heraea are visible on a hill west of the village of Agios Ioannis (St. John), bounded on either side by a ravine, and sloping down towards the river. These ruins extend along the summit of the hill and the slope towards the river; but they are inconsiderable, and have for the most part been cleared away in consequence of the fertility of the land.

== People ==
Famous Olympic champions from Heraia include Demaretos (520 BCE), his son Theopompos (516 BCE), his grandson Theopompos and others.

== Religion ==
The cult of Pan in Heraia differed from similar cults in central Arcadia. A famous statue of Pan with the face of Apollo, created by Polykleitos, was located in Heraia and can be seen stamped on gold coins from the region dating to the 4th century BCE. Silver coins of that era represented Hera, the city's patron goddess.

== Excavation ==
The site of Heraia was excavated by archeologist Alexander Philadelpheus in 1931. Today, the site remains generally closed to the public.
