= Asea (Arcadia) =

Town of ancient Arcadia

Coordinates: 37°24′18″N 22°16′59″E

Asea (Greece)

Asea (Ancient Greek: ἡ Ἀσέα) was a town of ancient Arcadia in the district Maenalia, situated near the frontier of Laconia, on the road from Megalopolis to Pallantium and Tegea. According to Greek mythology, Asea is said to be named for Aseatas, son of the Spartan king, Lycaon. During the Greco-Persian Wars, inhabitants of Asea fought in the historic Battle of Plataea (479 BCE). Asea took part in the foundation of Megalopolis, to which city most of its inhabitants removed in 371 BCE; but Asea continued to exist as an independent state, since the Aseatae are mentioned, along with the Megalopolitae, Tegeatae, and Pallantieis, as joining Epaminondas before the Battle of Mantineia in 362 BCE. At a later time, however, Asea belonged to Megalopolis, as we see from the descriptions of Strabo and Pausanias. The city was in ruins in the time of Pausanias (2nd century), who mentions its acropolis. In its territory, and at the distance of 5 stadia from the city, on the road to Pallantium, were the sources of the Alpheius, and near them those of the Eurotas. The two rivers united their streams, and, after flowing in one channel for 20 stadia, disappeared beneath the earth; the Alpheius rising again at Pagae, and the Eurotas at Belemina in Laconia. North of Asea, on the road to Pallantium, and on the summit of Mount Boreium, was a temple of Athena Soteira and Poseidon, said to have been founded by Odysseus on his return from Troy. City coins have been found dated 196 BCE.

== Archaeology ==
Ancient Asea occupied a hilltop site and is believed to have been settled by the late Early Helladic period. Evidence suggests that this was destroyed by fire and that the site was reoccupied during the Middle Helladic (MH). Remains consist of much Black Minyan pottery of various types and a number of graves. The lack of evidence later than the late MH period could result from abandonment of the site at that time or just from natural erosion. It may have been established as early as 6000 BC. Its treasures are kept in archaeological museums in Tripoli, Nafplio, and Athens. The ruins of the ancient city still stand, most notably Doric temples dedicated to Poseidon and Athena, and they indicate that Asea was once a prosperous city.

Its site is located near the modern Asea, which was renamed to reflect association with the ancient town.

== See also ==
- Swedish Institute at Athens

== Sources ==
- Swedish Institute at Athens - Asea Valley, Arcadia: https://www.sia.gr/en/articles.php?tid=356&page=1
