= Daseae =

Coordinates: 37°23′59″N 22°04′08″E

Daseae or Daseai (Ancient Greek: Δασέαι), also known as Dasea (Δασέα), was a town of ancient Arcadia in the district Parrhasia. It was situated on the road from Megalopolis to Phigalea, 7 stadia from Macareae, and 29 stadia from Megalopolis. It was in ruins in the time of Pausanias (2nd century), as its inhabitants had been removed to Megalopolis upon the foundation of the latter (371 BCE). Its name was apparently derived from the thick woods.

Its site is tentatively located near the modern Apiditsa.

== See also ==
- List of Ancient Greek cities
