= Phigalia =

Ancient Greek city in the Peloponnese

Coordinates: 37°23′47″N 21°50′21″E

- Location within Greece
- Region: Arcadia

Phigalia or Phigaleia or Phigalea (Ancient Greek: Φιγαλεία or Φιγαλέα or Φιγάλεια or Φιγαλία), also known as Phialia (Φιαλία or Φιάλεια), was an ancient Greek city in the south-west corner of ancient Arcadia, in the region of ancient Parrhasia close to the frontiers of Messenia, and upon the right bank of the Neda, about halfway between the sources and the mouth of this river. It is also the present name of a nearby modern village, known up to the early 20th century as Pavlitsa (Παύλιτσα). In modern geography it is located in southeastern Elis. It is situated on an elevated rocky site, among some of the highest mountains in the Peloponnese, the most conspicuous being called Cotylium and Elaeum; the identification of the latter is uncertain.

Within the ancient territory of Phigalia stands the Temple of Apollo Epicurius at Bassae, which the Phigalians built on the mountain known as Cotylium in the late fifth century BC.

== Name ==
The name Phigalia was more ancient than that of Phialia, but the original name had again come into use in the time of Pausanias. The city was said to have derived its more ancient name from Phigalus, a son of Lycaon, its legendary original founder, and its later name from Phialus, a son of Lycaon, its second founder.

== History ==
In 659 BC, Phigalia was taken by the Lacedaemonians, but soon after recovered its independence by the help of the Oresthasians, who, according to an oracle, perished fighting against the Lacedaemonians. In 375 BC, Phigalia was rent asunder by hostile factions; and the supporters of the Lacedaemonian party, being expelled from the city, took possession of a fortress in the neighbourhood named Heraea, from which they made excursions against Phigalia. During the struggle between the Achaean and Aetolian leagues in 221 BC it was held by Dorimachus, who left it on the approach of Philip V of Macedon. In common with the other cities of Arcadia, it appears in Strabo to have fallen into utter decay under Roman rule.

== Situation and remains ==
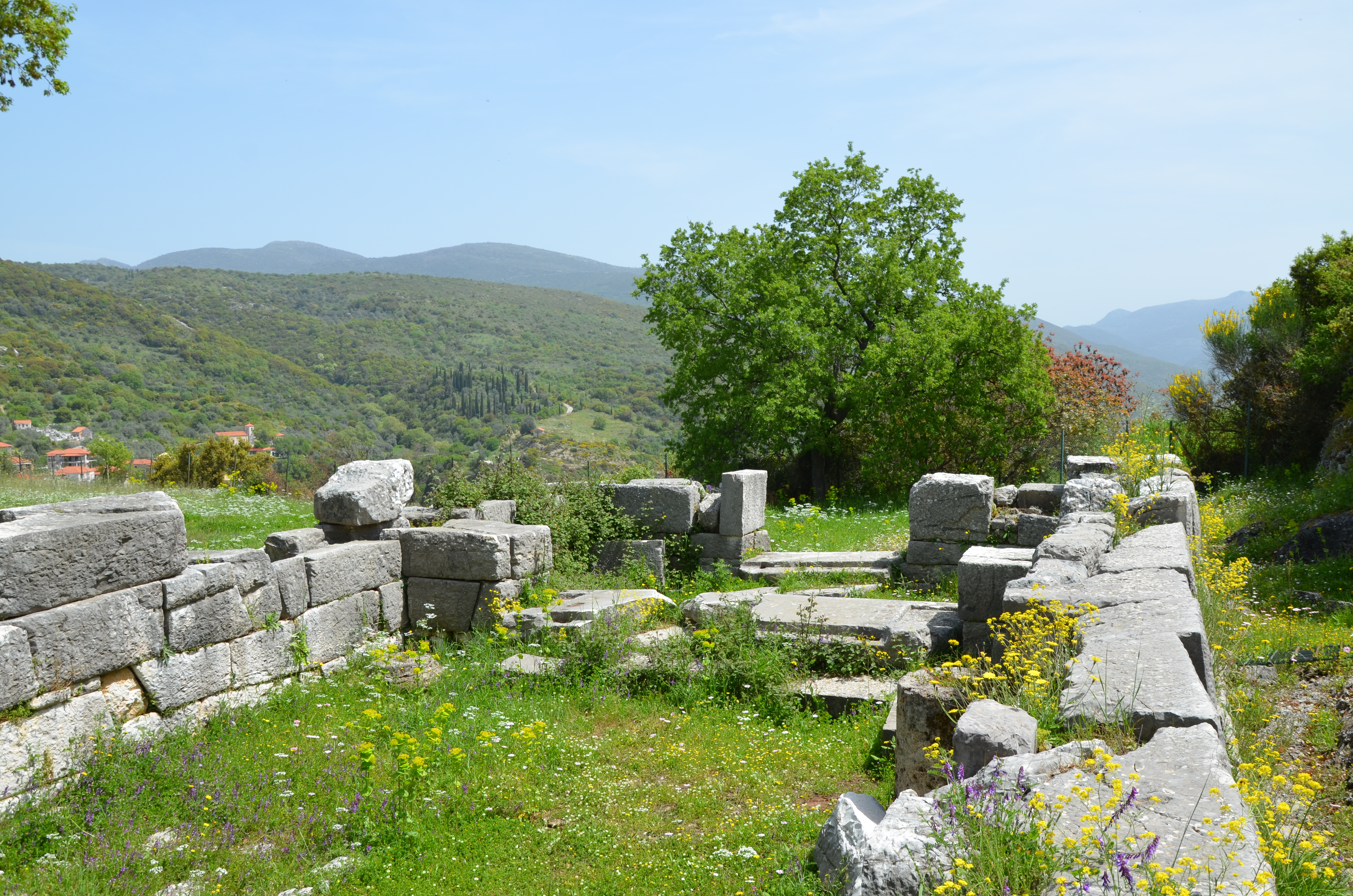
Temple of Athena

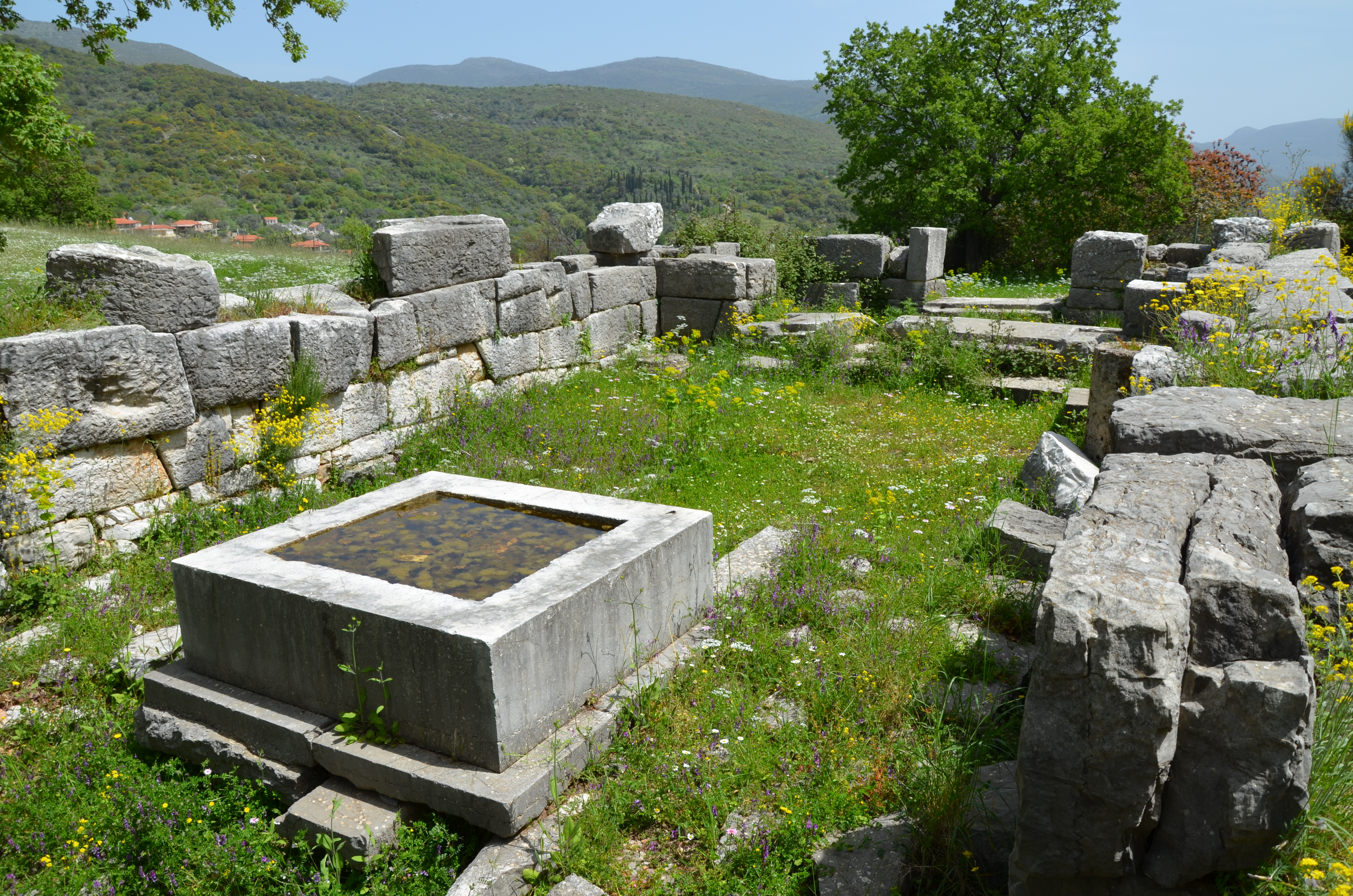
The ruins of the Temple of Athena in Phigalia

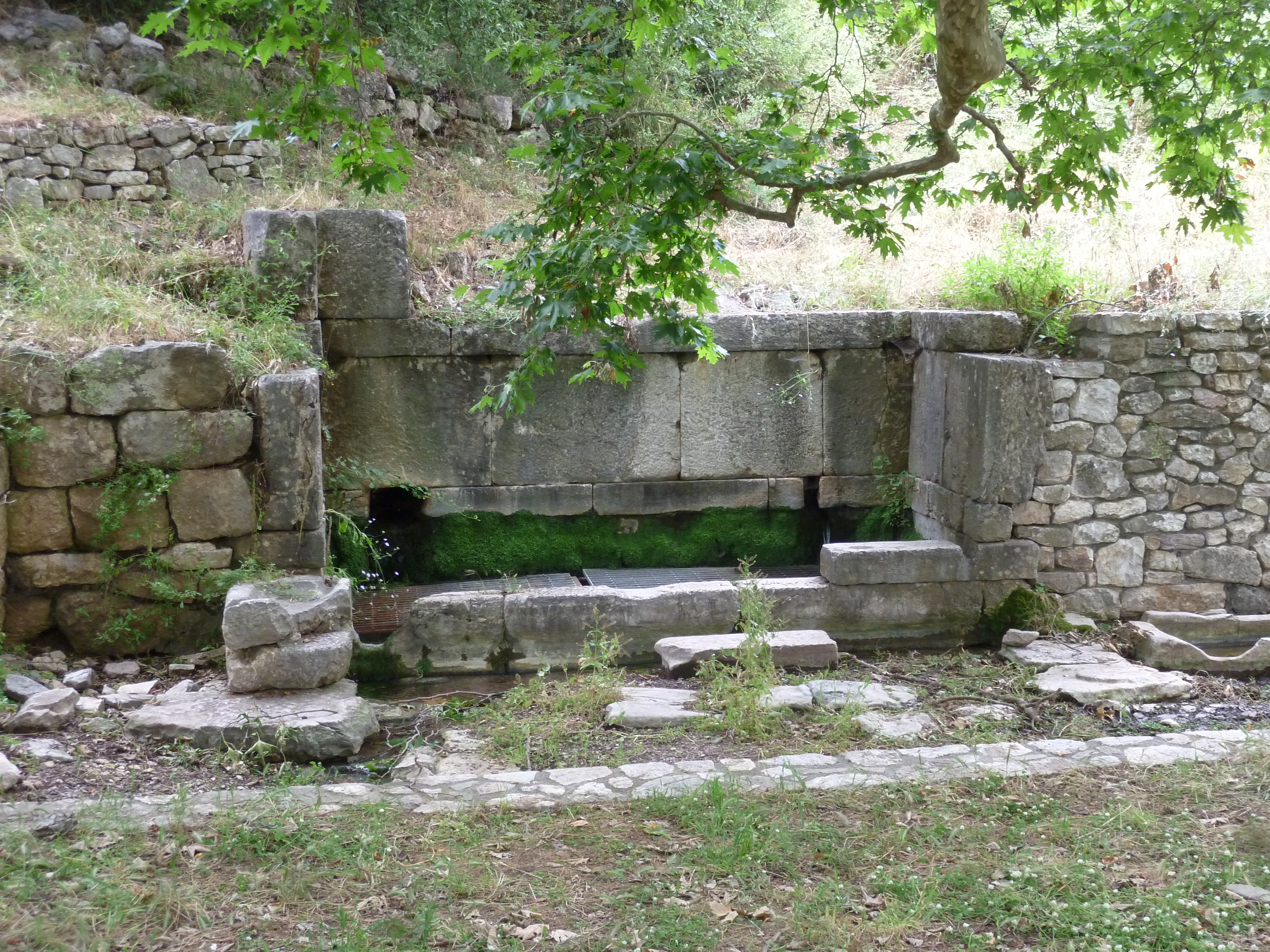
Ancient fountain

Phigalia was surrounded by mountains, of which Pausanias mentions two by name, Cotylium or Cotilium (τὸ Κωτίλιον) and Elaeum (τὸ Ἐλάϊομ), the former to the "left" of the city, at the distance of 30 stadia, and the latter to the "right" at the distance of 30 stadia. As Cotilium lies to the northeast of Phigalia, and Pausanias in this description seems to have looked towards the east, Elaeum should probably be placed on the opposite side of Phigalia, and consequently to the south of the Neda, in which case it would correspond to the lofty mountain of Kúvela. Elaeum contained a cavern sacred to the Black Demeter, situated in a grove of oaks.

Of the position of Cotylium there is no doubt. On it was situated the temple of Apollo Epicurius at Bassae built in the Peloponnesian War by Ictinus, the architect of the Parthenon at Athens. It was erected by the Phigaleans in consequence of the relief afforded by Apollo during the plague in the Peloponnesian War, whence he received the surname of Epicurius. According to Pausanias it excelled all the temples of Peloponnesus, except that of Athena Alea at Tegea, in the beauty of the stone and the accuracy of its masonry. The temple is at least two and a half hours walk from the ruins of the city, and consequently more than the 40 stadia, which Pausanias mentions as the distance from Phigalia to Cotilium; but this distance perhaps applies to the nearest part of the mountain from the city.

Several curious cults were preserved near Phigalia, including that of the fishtailed goddess Eurynome and the Black Demeter with a horse's head, whose image was renewed by Onatas. Notices of it in Greek history are rare and scanty. Though its existing ruins and the description of Pausanias, who describes it as situated upon a lofty and precipitous hill, the greater part of the walls being built upon the rocks, show it to have been a place of considerable strength and importance, no autonomous coins of Phigalia are known. Nothing remained above ground of the temples of Artemis or Dionysus and the numerous statues and other works of art which existed at the time of Pausanias' visit, about AD 170.

A great part of the city wall, built in fine Hellenic masonry, partly polygonal masonry and partly isodomic ashlar, and a large square central fortress with a circular projecting tower, are still traceable. The walls, once nearly 2 miles (3.2 km) in circuit, are strongly placed on rocks, which slope down to the little river Neda.

The rock, upon which the city stood, slopes down towards the Neda; on the western side it is bounded by a ravine and on the eastern by the torrent Lymax, which flows into the Neda. The walls are of the usual thickness, faced with masonry of the second order, and filled in the middle with rubble. On the summit of the acropolis within the walls are the remains of a detached citadel, 80 yards (73 m) in length, containing a round tower at the extremity, measuring 18 feet (5.5 m) in the interior diameter. In ancient times a temple of Artemis Soteira stood on the summit of the acropolis. On the slope of the mountain lay the gymnasium and the temple of Dionysus Acratophorus; and on the ground below, where the village of upper Figaleia stands, was the agora, adorned with a statue of the pancratiast Arrachion, who lost his life in the Olympic Games, and with the sepulchre of the Oresthasians, who perished to restore the Phigaleans to their native city. Upon a rock, difficult of access, near the union of the Lymax and the Neda, was a temple of Eurynome, supposed to be a surname of Artemis, which was opened only once a year. In the same neighbourhood, and at the distance of 12 stadia from the city, were some warm baths, traces of which are visible at the village of Tragói, but the waters have long ceased to flow.
