= Cyllene (mythology) =

Several figures in Greek mythology

In Greek mythology, Cyllene (/saɪˈliːniː/; Ancient Greek: Κυλλήνη, romanized: Kullḗnē or Kyllênê, lit. 'twisted queen' pronounced /kyllɛ̌ːnɛ/), also spelled Kyllene (/kaɪˈliːniː/) may refer to two characters:

- Cyllene, an Arcadian oread (mountain-nymph) who gave her name to the Mt. Cyllene. She nursed the infant god Hermes, who was born on Mt. Cyllene. She became the wife of Pelasgus by whom she bore the impious king, Lycaon. Otherwise, the latter's mother was either the Oceanid Meliboea or Deianira, daughter of another Lycaon. In some accounts, Cyllene was instead the wife of Lycaon but in others versions of the myth, his wife was called Nonacris.
- Cyllene, an Arcadian daughter of Menephron who was raped by her father. In some accounts, Menephon was the son who ravished his mother Cyllene.
