= Nonacris (mythology) =

Mythical Arcadian

In Greek mythology, Nonacris (Ancient Greek: Νώνακρις or Νωνακρίς, romanized: Nônakris; pronounced /noːˈnaː.krɪs/ or /noʊˈneɪkrɪs/, No-NAH-kris) was the wife of King Lycaon of Arcadia and mother of Callisto, from whom the town of Nonacris was believed to have derived its name. From this town Hermes and Evander are called Nonacriates and Nonacrius, in the general sense of Arcadian. Otherwise, the spouse of Lycaon was called the nymph Cyllene.
