= Megalopoli Mine =

Open-pit mine in Arcadia, Greece

Coordinates: 37.3800°N 22.1082°E

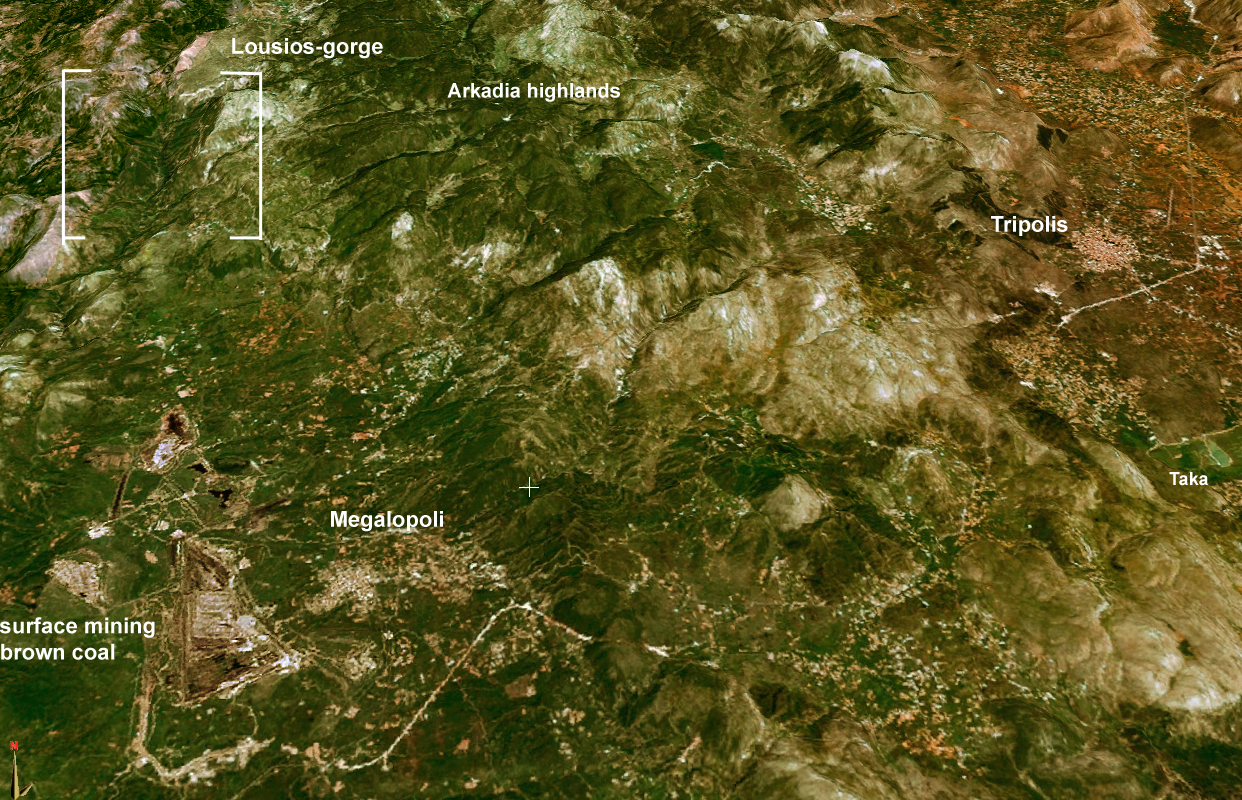
Landsat 7 image showing the mine in relation to Megalopoli

The Megalopoli Mine is a large lignite and coal open-pit mine owned by the Public Power Corporation of Greece that began in the early-1970s after the completion of the Megalopoli Power Plant. It mined approximately 40 km² or 4,000 ha of which 25 to 30 km² or 2,500 to 3,000 ha of land have been mined. With a timespan of 37 years, it is the largest mine in the Peloponnese and southern Greece and is ranked near Amyntaio and after Ptolemaida.

Coal is shipped on the west side, the shipping truck-only roads are in the middle of the mine.

== History ==
The mine began in the 1970s and continues to expand until the plant closure in which the date is not yet set. The mine removed the settlement of Psatha 2 km east to near Megalopoli and Anthochori in which the moving the settlement is unknown. It also changed the Alfeios River course to south and west of the mines in which used to run through Psatha as well as another river to the northeast and at that time formed a tributary at Tripotamo in which it receives the settlement name.

The expansion of the mine forced the curtailment or realignment of Arcadia provincial roads 29 (between Megalopoli and Leontari) and 32 (between Megalopoli and Vastas), as well as the EO7 road: at that time, the mine became the largest in all of the Peloponnese. The Thoknia and the Kyparissia mines were later mined. Years later, the mine had reached the settlement boundary taking away farmlands and extended southward where it is currently near the forest and is expected to be at the line of the Tripotamo-Anthochori Road. It will not affect the settlement of Tripotamo. By the time it reaches near Tripotamo, the power plant may be scheduled to close. The closure means the population growth will end.

== See also ==
- Energy in Greece
