= Petrina, Arcadia =

Petrina Πετρίνα
- Community
- Location within Greece
- Coordinates: 37°17′N 22°12′E
- Country: Greece
- Administrative region: Peloponnese
- Regional unit: Arcadia
- Municipality: Megalopoli
- Municipal unit: Falaisia

Population (2021)
  - Community: 42
- Time zone: UTC+2 (EET)
  - Summer (DST): UTC+3 (EEST)

Petrina (Greek: Πετρίνα) is a village and a community in the municipal unit of Falaisia, Arcadia, Greece. It is situated in the northern foothills of the Taygetus mountains. It is 3 km east of Falaisia, 4 km west of Skortsinos, 4 km south of Voutsaras, 7 km southeast of Leontari and 14 km southeast of Megalopoli. The community includes the village Spanaiika.

== Population ==
Year	Population village	Population community
1981	-	420
1991	58	-
2001	50	90
2011	44	69
2021	23	42

== In media ==
In 2014 the US TV show Finding Your Roots found that Tina Fey have ancestors from this village.

== See also ==
- List of settlements in Arcadia
