= Malea (Arcadia) =

Town in ancient Arcadia

Coordinates: 37°19′58″N 22°11′31″E

Malea (Ancient Greek: Μαλέα) was a town in the district of Aegytis in ancient Arcadia, the inhabitants of which were transferred to Megalopolis upon the foundation of the latter city (371 BCE). Its territory was called the Maleatis (ἡ Μαλεᾶτις). Xenophon describes Leuctra as a fortress situated above the Maleatis. The place Midea (Μιδέα) mentioned by Xenophon may be a corrupt form of Malea.

Its site is tentatively located south of the modern Voutsaras.
