= Giannaioi =

Giannaioi Γιανναίοι
- Community
- Location within Greece
- Coordinates: 37°14′N 22°11′E
- Country: Greece
- Administrative region: Peloponnese
- Regional unit: Arcadia
- Municipality: Megalopoli
- Municipal unit: Falaisia

Population (2021)
  - Community: 49
- Time zone: UTC+2 (EET)
  - Summer (DST): UTC+3 (EEST)

Giannaioi (Greek: Γιανναίοι) is a community of the municipal unit of Falaisia in Arcadia, Peloponnese, Greece. It consists of the two mountain villages Ano Giannaioi and Kato Giannaioi. Ano Giannaioi is 1 km southeast of Kato Giannaioi. Both villages are situated on a mountain slope, in the northern foothills of the Taygetus mountains, between 600 and 700 m elevation. Kato Giannaioi is 1 km south of Kamara, 5 km north of Dyrrachio, 11 km southeast of Leontari and 19 km south of Megalopoli.

== Population ==
Year	Kato Giannaioi	Ano Giannaioi	Community
1991	73	-	-
2001	66	23	89
2011	47	35	82
2021	36	13	49

== See also ==
- List of settlements in Arcadia
