= Akovos =

Akovos Άκοβος
- Community
- Location within Greece
- Coordinates: 37°11′32″N 22°09′43″E
- Country: Greece
- Administrative region: Peloponnese
- Regional unit: Arcadia
- Municipality: Megalopoli
- Municipal unit: Falaisia
- Elevation: 900 m (3,000 ft)

Population (2021)
  - Community: 121
- Time zone: UTC+2 (EET)
  - Summer (DST): UTC+3 (EEST)
- Postal code: 220 21
- Area code: +30 27910

Akovos (Greek: Άκοβος) is a mountain village and a community in the municipal unit of Falaisia, southwestern Arcadia, Greece. It is situated in the foothills of the Taygetus mountains.

Its nearest villages are Dyrrachio and Leptini. It is 4 kilometres (2.5 mi) west of Dyrrachio, 4 km northeast of Poliani (Messenia), 15 km (9.3 mi) south of Leontari and 23 km (14 mi) south of Megalopoli. The community includes the village Goupata.

== History ==
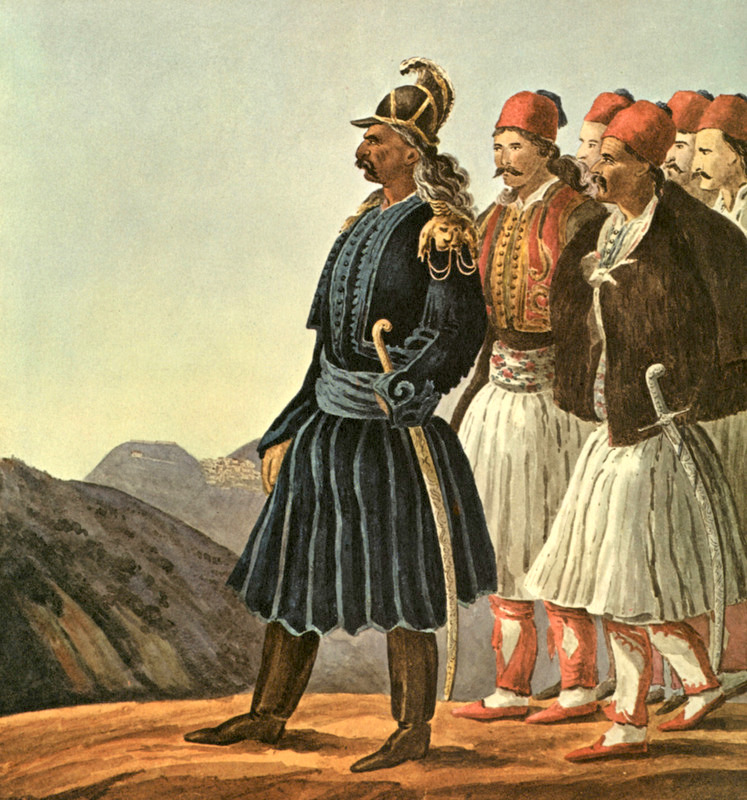
Pierre Peytier, Kololotronis and his personal escort

Theodoros Kolokotronis married and settled for several years in Akovos. In 1825, he fought a battle nearby in the village of Drampala against Ibrahim Pasha of Egypt. While waiting in Akovos for Ibrahim's forces, Kolokotronis vowed with the villagers that he would build a larger church, and he carved his initials into a stone of the Agia Sotira church. The anniversary of the battle is celebrated by the town on the day of the Pentecost. As of 2008, his home is the village's Cultural Centre.

== Overview ==
In keeping with its name for water, the village has a number of water fountains, one of which is named "Neraidovrysi".

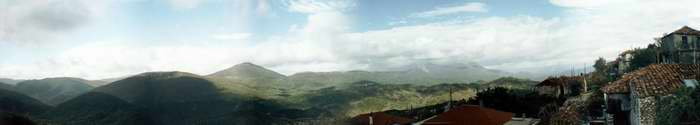

== Population ==
Year	Population village	Population community
2001	246	264
2011	182	202
2021	112	121

== Goupata ==
Part of the Akovos community, Goupata is a small settlement of less than 50 people near the village of Kamara and the Kato Gianei settlement. It is about 5 kilometres (5,000 m) north of the center of Akovos.

== Religion ==
One of the churches in Akovos is Saint Nicholas Orthodox Church, a Greek Orthodox church.

There are many chapels in the village and they hold celebrations throughout the years. A festival is held on St. George's Day, due to the historic tradition of Kourbani. It was started in the village by Kolokotroni's father-in-law, who offered a calf each year to St. George. Now, only visitors have right to the food from a donated calf. There are also festivals on the day of the Pentecost in an Agia Triada. Festivals are also held at the church of Virgin Mary and Agia Paraskevi. Another chapel is Agia Solomoni.

== People from Akovos ==
- Maria Menounos' father, Costas Menounos
- Sotirios Christopoulos

== See also ==
- List of settlements in Arcadia
