= Ellinitsa =

Ellinitsa Ελληνίτσα
- Community
- Location within Greece
- Coordinates: 37°18′N 22°7′E
- Country: Greece
- Administrative region: Peloponnese
- Regional unit: Arcadia
- Municipality: Megalopoli
- Municipal unit: Falaisia

Population (2021)
  - Community: 44
- Time zone: UTC+2 (EET)
  - Summer (DST): UTC+3 (EEST)

Ellinitsa (Greek: Ελληνίτσα) is a village in the municipal unit of Falaisia, in Arcadia, Greece. It is located on a hillside, 2 km west of Potamia, 3 km southwest of Leontari, 4 km southeast of Paradeisia and 11 km south of Megalopoli.

== Population ==
Year	Population
1981	62
1991	82
2001	95
2011	50
2021	44

== See also ==
- List of settlements in Arcadia
