= Veligosti =

Veligosti Βελιγοστή
- Community
- Location within Greece
- Coordinates: 37°19′N 22°7′E
- Country: Greece
- Administrative region: Peloponnese
- Regional unit: Arcadia
- Municipality: Megalopoli
- Municipal unit: Falaisia

Population (2021)
  - Community: 60
- Time zone: UTC+2 (EET)
  - Summer (DST): UTC+3 (EEST)

Veligosti (Greek: Βελιγοστή, before 1918: Σαμαρά - Samara) is a settlement in the municipal unit of Falaisia, Arcadia, Greece. It is situated on a low hill, on the left bank of a tributary of the river Alfeios. It is 2 km west of Leontari, 3 km north of Ellinitsa, 4 km east of Paradeisia and 9 km south of Megalopoli.

== Population ==
Year	Population
1981	175
1991	98
2001	131
2011	61
2021	60

== History ==
Veligosti was founded during the Byzantine era and the ruins of the Byzantine settlement and a tower are still visible today. During the Frankish period, according to the Chronicle of the Morea, Geoffrey I Villehardouin made it a barony (one of the twelve in the Peloponnese). The barony was destroyed in about 1300, and during the Ottoman period it lost its importance.

== See also ==
- List of settlements in Arcadia
