= Anthochori, Arcadia =

Abandoned settlement in Arcadia, Greece

Anthochori Ανθοχώρι
- Settlement
- Location within Greece
- Coordinates: 37°22′N 22°8′E
- Country: Greece
- Administrative region: Peloponnese
- Regional unit: Arcadia
- Municipality: Megalopoli
- Municipal unit: Megalopoli

Population (2021)
  - Community: 0
- Time zone: UTC+2 (EET)
  - Summer (DST): UTC+3 (EEST)

Anthochori (Greek: Ανθοχώρι meaning "flower village", before 1927: Καρούμπαλι - Karoumpali) was a settlement in Arcadia, Greece. Anthochori was demolished from 2006 to 2008 due to the expansion of the Megalopoli Mine.

== Geography ==
Anthochori was located about 3 km south of the town of Megalopoli, in the valley of the Alfeios river. Prior to the large scale exploitation of lignite in open-pit mines, the area consisted mostly of farmlands. Neighboring villages were Vrysoules to the east, Gefyra to the southeast and Tripotamo to the southwest. The Greek National Road 7 (Kalamata - Megalopoli - Tripoli) ran east of Anthochori. Anthochori had a station on the short branch railway line from Lefktro, on the Tripoli-Kalamata railway line, to Megalopoli.

== History ==
According to the History of Leontarion Province by Theodoros Katrivanos the village occupied the area that was the Karum Ali Estate (Καρούμ Αλή τσιφλίκι), itself part of the Leontario vilayet (Ottoman administrative division, in Greek: Βιλαέτι Λεονταρίου) in the 18th century. Hence the old name of the village was Karoumpali. The village was re-named Anthochori in 1927 (FEK 179/1927).

In terms of its administration, Karoumpali/Anthochori was established as an independent community (Greek: κοινότητα) in 1912. The legal basis for this comprised Law No 4057 of 10 February 1912 that enacted the institution of "administratively independent communities" in Greece and the Royal Decree of 18 September 1912 that clarified specific arrangements for the law's implementation in the prefecture of Arcadia. Anthochori continued to function as an independent community until the end of 1997 when the "Kapodistrias" program of reforms began to be implemented. Following the fate of the vast majority of other communities in Greece, Anthochori was abolished as an administratively independent community and since 1 January 1999 became an administrative district of the Municipality of Megalopolis.

By 2006, after prolonged legal battles and court cases the vast majority of property owners of Anthochori were financially compensated by the Public Power Corporation. Financial compensation for the public property and amenities that belonged to the community was transferred to the Municipality of Megalopolis. This was because, as mentioned above, Anthochori became an administrative district of the Municipality of Megalopolis following the "Kapodistrias" reforms. What happened to the financial compensation for Anthochori's public property is still a matter of dispute and allegations for the mismanagement of compensation funds (at least €280,000) were still being made as late as November 2008.

=== Loss of a settlement ===
The lignite mining activity has been slowly extending towards Anthochori since the late-1970s. By 2002 mining machinery stood 1 km to the northwest of Anthochori and the mine finally reached the first houses of the settlement in 2006. Village houses became a target for looters and the settlement was finally abandoned in 2007. Subsequently, starting from its northwestern part, the old village homes were demolished and their remains were dumped to the south while the roads, already closed for some years, were eventually removed. Most of the farmlands and forests also disappeared.

Until late 2008 the only remaining building of Anthochori left standing was its main church dedicated to the Presentation of the Virgin to the Temple (Greek: Τα Εισόδια της Θεοτόκου). None of the demolition workers were willing to take responsibility for its destruction and, thus, the church remained standing upon a tall "column" of soil while the surrounding earth was being excavated. The "last church standing" became internationally famous when its photograph by Stuart Franklin appeared in Time magazine on 17 September 2008.

On 29 November 2008 the church collapsed upon itself and, with it, all visible evidence of Anthochori's material existence ended. By the mid-2009 all that once was the village of Anthochori was gone, its buildings leveled, and its earth scraped out to extract lignite. It is claimed that the demolition of Anthochori marks the final expansion of the lignite mine which, in turn, signals the beginning of the end for the Megalopolis thermo-electric power plant.

=== An internet "ghost" ===
At least until the end of 2009 Anthochori was still mentioned in some maps, including MapQuest, while satellite images have yet to show the expansion of the lignite mine over the area that used to be Anthochori. For example, when accessed on 15 November 2009, Google Earth still used a detailed satellite photo taken on 26 August 2003, where Anthochori's buildings and original geography are clearly visible. This satellite picture can be found here.

=== Anthochori's demolition in the media ===
Megalopolis' mine expansion was featured on a TV documentary on April 7, 2006. This documentary was produced by the Hellenic Broadcasting Corporation (ERT).

In 2008, Time magazine published a short article under the title "Europe's changing places" which used a dramatic photo of Anthochori's main church - the Presentation of the Virgin to the Temple (Greek: Τα Εισόδια της Θεοτόκου) - taken by world famous British photographer Stuart Franklin in 2007. In this picture the church stands alone on a tall "column" of soil, as the sole survivor of the demolished village at the time. This picture is included in Stuart Franklin's book Footprint: Our Landscape in Flux.

The same picture was included in a presentation of Stuart Franklin's work in the Guardian newspaper, accompanied by the following note by the photographer:

To the ancient Greeks, Arcadia was a rural idyll. Instead of a lush, bucolic landscape, I found one devastated by the hunt for fossil fuels. Sixty per cent of Greece's electricity is derived from lignite (brown coal). This involves bulldozing whole landscapes to feed the nearby power station. In Megalopolis I found Greece's second largest lignite mine. The village of Anthohori in Arcadia was wiped off the map - the church of Santa Maria was all that remained.

== Photos of Anthochori and its surroundings ==
Satellite views

- Anthochori: Satellite picture (26 August 2003)

During its demolition

- "Last Church Standing". Time. "The church of Santa Maria [sic] is the last building left standing in Anthochori, Greece, after the rest of the village was demolished for lignite mining."
- Anthochori's main church - 'The Presentation of the Virgin to the Temple' (Greek: Τα Εισόδια της Θεοτόκου) - 1, date unknown
- Anthochori's main church - 'The Presentation of the Virgin to the Temple' (Greek: Τα Εισόδια της Θεοτόκου) - 2, date unknown

Prior to its demolition

Churches, lanes, fields

- View of Anthochori - 1 (taken from the main road entry to the village), date unknown
- View of Anthochori - 2 (taken from the church's bell tower), date unknown
- View of Anthochori - 3 (taken from fields with the church's bell tower in the background), date unknown
- View of Anthochori - 4 (taken from fields with Holly Trinity Church of Anthochori in the background), date unknown
- View of Anthochori - 5 - Holly Trinity Church of Anthochori (Greek: Αγία Τριάδα Ανθοχωρίου), date unknown

Houses

- House in Anthochori -1 (Greek: Σπίτι στο Ανθοχώρι Μεγαλοπόλεως - 1), date unknown
- House in Anthochori -2 (Greek: Σπίτι στο Ανθοχώρι Μεγαλοπόλεως - 2), date unknown
- House in Anthochori -3 (Greek: Σπίτι στο Ανθοχώρι Μεγαλοπόλεως - 3), date unknown
- House in Anthochori -4 (Greek: Σπίτι στο Ανθοχώρι Μεγαλοπόλεως - 4), date unknown
- House in Anthochori -5 (Greek: Σπίτι στο Ανθοχώρι Μεγαλοπόλεως - 5), date unknown
- House in Anthochori -6 (Greek: Σπίτι στο Ανθοχώρι Μεγαλοπόλεως - 6), date unknown
- House in Anthochori -7 (Greek: Σπίτι στο Ανθοχώρι Μεγαλοπόλεως - 7), date unknown
- House in Anthochori -8 (Greek: Σπίτι στο Ανθοχώρι Μεγαλοπόλεως - 8), date unknown
- House in Anthochori -9 (Greek: Σπίτι στο Ανθοχώρι Μεγαλοπόλεως - 9), date unknown
- House in Anthochori -10 (Greek: Σπίτι στο Ανθοχώρι Μεγαλοπόλεως - 10), date unknown

Views of Anthochori railway 'station'

- Anthochori railway 'station' (Greek: Σταθμαρχείο Ανθοχωρίου - 1), date unknown)
- Anthochori railway 'station' (Greek: Σταθμαρχείο Ανθοχωρίου - 2), date unknown)

Views of Lefktron/'Bilali' railway station

- Lefktron/'Bilali' railway station - 1 (date unknown)
- Lefktron/'Bilali' railway station - 2 (date unknown)
- Lefktron/'Bilali' railway station - 3 (date unknown)
- Lefktron/'Bilali' railway station - 4 (date unknown)

== Population ==
Year	Population
1981	66
1991	72
2001	78
2011	41
2021	0

== See also ==
- List of settlements in Arcadia
