= Graikos =

Graikos Γραικός
- Community
- Location within Greece
- Coordinates: 37°19′N 22°14′E
- Country: Greece
- Administrative region: Peloponnese
- Regional unit: Arcadia
- Municipality: Megalopoli
- Municipal unit: Falaisia

Population (2021)
  - Community: 2
- Time zone: UTC+2 (EET)
  - Summer (DST): UTC+3 (EEST)

Graikos (Greek: Γραικός) is a village in the municipal unit of Falaisia, Arcadia, Greece. It is situated on a hillside, 2 km northwest of Skortsinos, 3 km south of Anavryto, 3 km southeast of Voutsaras, and 13 km southeast of Megalopoli. Graikos suffered damage from the 2007 Greek forest fires.

== Population ==
Year	Population
1991	38
2001	61
2011	23
2021	2

== See also ==
- List of settlements in Arcadia
