= Gatheae =

Coordinates: 37°17′55″N 22°03′40″E

Gatheae or Gatheai (Ancient Greek: Γαθεαί) was a town of ancient Arcadia in the district Cromitis, situated upon the river Gatheatas (Γαθεάτας), which rose near the place, and which, after receiving the Carnion (Καπνίων), rising in the territory of Aegys, flowed into the Alpheius.

Its site is located near the modern Chirades (Spherdouklolakka).
