= Soulari, Arcadia =

Soulari Σουλάρι
- Community
- Location within Greece
- Coordinates: 37°19′N 22°11′E
- Country: Greece
- Administrative region: Peloponnese
- Regional unit: Arcadia
- Municipality: Megalopoli
- Municipal unit: Falaisia

Population (2021)
  - Community: 34
- Time zone: UTC+2 (EET)
  - Summer (DST): UTC+3 (EEST)

Soulari (Greek: Σουλάρι) is a village in the municipal unit Falaisia, Arcadia, Greece. It is situated 3 km north of Falaisia, 3 km southwest of Voutsaras, 3 km southeast of Leontari and 11 km southeast of Megalopoli. The name Soulari comes from the Turkish word "sular" meaning waters. The village is located near the Kefalovryso and Kolokytha springs.

== Population ==
Year	Population
1981	152
1991	61
2001	109
2011	83
2021	34

== See also ==
- List of settlements in Arcadia
