= Leptini =

Leptini Λεπτίνι
- Community
- Location within Greece
- Coordinates: 37°11′N 22°11′E
- Country: Greece
- Administrative region: Peloponnese
- Regional unit: Arcadia
- Municipality: Megalopoli
- Municipal unit: Falaisia

Population (2021)
  - Community: 29
- Time zone: UTC+2 (EET)
  - Summer (DST): UTC+3 (EEST)

Leptini (Greek: Λεπτίνι) is a mountain village in the municipal unit Falaisia, southwestern Arcadia, Greece. Leptini is 1 km east of Akovos, 2 km west of Dyrrachio and 24 km south of Megalopoli. Leptini suffered damage from the 2007 Greek forest fires.

== Population ==
| Year | Population |
|---|---|
| 1981 | 89 |
| 1991 | 95 |
| 2001 | 69 |
| 2011 | 43 |
| 2021 | 29 |

== See also ==
- List of settlements in Arcadia
