= Anthochori =

Anthochori (Greek: Ανθοχώρι, meaning "flower town") may refer to several places in Greece:

- Anthochori, Arcadia, a village in Arcadia
- Anthochori, Rhodope, a village in the Rhodope regional unit 41° 5'5.50"N 25°32'18.41"E
- Anthochori, Phthiotis, a village in Phthiotis
- Anthochori, Ioannina, a village in the Ioannina regional unit
- Anthochori, Kozani, a village in the Kozani regional unit
- Anthochori, Thesprotia, a village in Thesprotia
- Anthochori, Lakonia, a village in Laconia
