= Isari =

Isari may refer to:

- Isari, Afghanistan, a village in northeastern Afghanistan
- Isaris, a village in Arcadia, southern Greece
