= Neochori =

Neochori (Greek: Νεοχώρι, meaning "new village") may refer to the following places:

- Neochori Aristomenous, a village in the municipal unit of Messini, Messenia
- Neochori Ithomis, a village in the municipal unit of Meligalas, Messenia
- Neochori Mesolongiou, a village in the municipal unit of Oiniades, Aetolia-Acarnania
- Neochori Nafpaktias, a village in the municipal unit of Platanos, Aetolia-Acarnania
- Neochori Falaisias, a village in the municipal unit of Falaisia, Arcadia
- Neochori Gortynias, a village in the municipal unit of Tropaia, Arcadia
- Neochori Lykosouras, a village in the municipality of Megalopoli, Arcadia
- Neochori Mantineias, a village in the municipal unit of Korythio, Arcadia
- Neochori Ypatis, a village in the municipal unit of Ypati, Phthiotis
- Neochori Tymfristou, a village in the municipal unit of Agios Georgios Tymfristou, Phthiotis
- Neochori, Argolis, a village in the municipal unit of Lyrkeia, Argolis
- Neochori, Arta, a village in the municipal unit of Arachthos, Arta regional unit
- Neochori Thespion, a village in the municipal unit of Thespies, Boeotia
- Neochori, Cephalonia, a village in the municipal unit of Erisos, Cephalonia
- Neochori, Chalkidiki, a village in the municipal unit of Arnaia, Chalkidiki
- Neochori, Chios, a village in the municipal unit of Agios Minas, Chios
- Neochori, Corfu, a village in the municipal unit of Lefkimmi, Corfu
- Neochori, Domokos, a village in the municipal unit of Domokos, Phthiotis
- Neochori, Euboea, a village in the municipal unit of Avlon, Euboea
- Neochori, Evros, a village in the municipality of Orestiada, Evros regional unit
- Neochori, Grevena, a village in the municipal unit of Ventzio, Grevena regional unit
- Neochori Myrtountion, a village in the municipal unit of Kastro-Kyllini, Elis
- Neochori, Imathia, a village in the municipality of Alexandreia, Imathia
- Neochori, Ioannina, a village in the municipal unit of Pasaronas, Ioannina regional unit
- Neochori, Karditsa, a village in the municipal unit of Nevropoli Agrafon, Karditsa regional unit
- Neochori, Kerkini, a village in the municipal unit of Kerkini, Serres regional unit
- Neochori, Laconia, a village in the municipal unit of Gytheio, Laconia
- Neochori, Lefkada, a village in the municipal unit of Ellomenos, Lefkada
- Neochori, Lefktro, a village in the municipal unit of Lefktro, Messenia
- Neochori, Lesbos, a village in the municipal unit of Plomari, Lesbos
- Neochori, Magnesia, a village in the municipal unit of Afetes, Magnesia
- Neochori, Samos, a village in the municipal unit of Marathokampos, Samos
- Neochori Strymona, a village in the municipal unit of Strymonas, Serres regional unit
- Neochori, Thesprotia, a village in the municipal unit of Paramythia, Thesprotia
- Neochori, Xanthi, a village in the municipal unit of Stavroupoli, Xanthi regional unit
- Neochori, Zacharo, a village in the municipal unit of Zacharo, Elis

== See also ==
- Neo Chorio
