= Potamia, Arcadia =

Potamia Ποταμιά
- Community
- Location within Greece
- Coordinates: 37°18′N 22°9′E
- Country: Greece
- Administrative region: Peloponnese
- Regional unit: Arcadia
- Municipality: Megalopoli
- Municipal unit: Falaisia

Population (2021)
  - Community: 51
- Time zone: UTC+2 (EET)
  - Summer (DST): UTC+3 (EEST)

Potamia (Greek: Ποταμιά meaning rivers) is a village in the municipal unit of Falaisia, Arcadia, Greece. It is on the right bank of a tributary of the river Alfeios, 2 km (1.2 mi) east of Ellinitsa, 3 km (1.9 mi) south of Leontari, 3 km (1.9 mi) northwest of Falaisia and 12 km (7.5 mi) south of Megalopoli. Every year in August the Parrasia folklore festival is organised in Potamia.

== Population ==
| Year | Population |
|---|---|
| 1981 | 123 |
| 1991 | 116 |
| 2001 | 100 |
| 2011 | 118 |
| 2021 | 51 |

== See also ==
- List of settlements in Arcadia
