= Perivola =

Perivola (Greek: Περιβόλα) may refer to:

- Perivola, Patras, a neighborhood in southeastern Patras
- Perivola A.O., a football (soccer) club in Patras

== See also ==
- Perivolia (disambiguation)
