= Graikos (disambiguation) =

Graikos (Greek: Γραικός) may refer to:

- Graikos (name), a Greek name, the origin of the modern English noun "Greek"
- Graikos, a village in Arcadia, Greece
- Graecus, the son of Pandora and Zeus
