= Gefyra =

Gefyra (Greek: Γέφυρα) which literally means bridge may refer to several villages in Greece:

- Gefyra, Arcadia, a village in Arcadia
- Gefyra, Thessaloniki, a village in the Thessaloniki regional unit

The word gefyra (bridge) in Greek also refers to the Rio-Antirio Bridge in informal everyday speech, originating from the domain name of the bridge's official internet site.
