= Souli, Arcadia =

Souli Σούλι
- Community
- Location within Greece
- Coordinates: 37°17′N 22°3′E
- Country: Greece
- Administrative region: Peloponnese
- Regional unit: Arcadia
- Municipality: Megalopoli
- Municipal unit: Megalopoli
- Elevation: 500 m (1,600 ft)

Population (2021)
  - Community: 66
- Time zone: UTC+2 (EET)
  - Summer (DST): UTC+3 (EEST)
- Postal code: 222 00
- Area code: 27430
- Vehicle registration: TP

Souli (Greek: Σούλι) is a village and a community in the municipality of Megalopoli in southwestern Arcadia, Greece. The community consists of the mountain villages Souli and Derveni. Both villages are located in the mountains on the border with Messenia, at about 500 m elevation. Derveni is on the old road from Megalopoli to Kalamata, and Souli is 1 km southeast of it. Souli is 2 km west of Chirades, 4 km southwest of Paradeisia, 15 km southwest of Megalopoli and 30 km north of Kalamata. Souli suffered damage from the 2007 Greek forest fires.

== Historical population ==
Historical population
Year	Pop.	±%
2001	88	—
2011	73	−17.0%
2021	66	−9.6%

== See also ==
- List of settlements in Arcadia
