= Lykaio =

Lykaio may refer to:

- Mount Lykaion, Greece
- Lykaio (town), Greece
