= Kampochori =

Kampochori may refer to several places in Greece:

- Kampochori, Arcadia, a village in Arcadia
- Kampochori, Imathia, a village in the municipal unit of Alexandreia, Imathia
- Kampochori, Kilkis, a village in the municipal unit of Axioupoli, Kilkis regional unit
