= Proseis =

Proseis (Ancient Greek: Προσεῖς), also known as Prosenses, was a town of ancient Arcadia, in the district of Parrhasia. The people of Proseis moved to Megalopolis upon the founding of that city in 371 BCE.

Its site is unlocated.
