= Neochori Lykosouras =

Neochori Lykosouras Νεοχώρι Λυκοσούρας
- Community
- Location within Greece
- Coordinates: 37°21′N 22°4′E
- Country: Greece
- Administrative region: Peloponnese
- Regional unit: Arcadia
- Municipality: Megalopoli
- Municipal unit: Megalopoli

Population (2021)
  - Community: 22
- Time zone: UTC+2 (EET)
  - Summer (DST): UTC+3 (EEST)

Neochori Lykosouras (Greek: Νεοχώρι Λυκοσούρας) is a village in the municipality of Megalopoli, Arcadia, Greece. It is situated on a hillside overlooking the Alfeios river valley, at about 490 m elevation. It is 3 km north of Paradeisia, 3 km southwest of Tripotamo, 5 km southeast of Isaris and 8 km southwest of Megalopoli.

== Population ==
Year	Population
1981	117
1991	94
2001	80
2011	49
2021	22

== See also ==
- List of settlements in Arcadia
