= Ptolederma =

Town of ancient Arcadia, Greece

Ptolederma (Ancient Greek: Πτολέδερμα) was a town of ancient Arcadia, Greece, in the region of Eutresia. It was deserted in consequence of the removal of its inhabitants to Megalopolis. Its site is unlocated.
