= Tourkolekas =

Tourkolekas Τουρκολέκας
- Community
- Location within Greece
- Coordinates: 37°15′N 22°7.2′E
- Country: Greece
- Administrative region: Peloponnese
- Regional unit: Arcadia
- Municipality: Megalopoli
- Municipal unit: Falaisia

Population (2021)
  - Community: 131
- Time zone: UTC+2 (EET)
  - Summer (DST): UTC+3 (EEST)

Tourkolekas (Greek: Τουρκολέκας) is a settlement in the municipal unit of Falaisia, southwest Arcadia, Greece. It is situated in the mountains near the border with Messenia, at about 800 m elevation. It is 5 km west of Kamara, 6 km northeast of Pefko (Messenia), 8 km southwest of Leontari and 17 km south of Megalopoli. Every August, Tourkolekas celebrates its Nikitareia festival in honour of Nikitaras, a Greek revolutionary leader. There is a marble statue of Nikitaras in the village.

== Population ==
Year	Population
1981	318
1991	274
2001	301
2011	190
2021	131

== See also ==
- List of settlements in Arcadia
