= Vrysoules =

Vrysoules (Greek: Βρυσούλες) may refer to several places in Cyprus and Greece:

== In Cyprus ==
- Vrysoules, Cyprus, located near Famagusta, next to the occupied territory from Turkish Forces since 1974

== In Greece ==
- Vrysoules, Arcadia, a village in Arcadia
- Vrysoules, Arta, a village in the municipal unit Vlacherna, Arta regional unit
