= Kastanochori, Arcadia =

Kastanochori Καστανοχώρι
- Community
- Location within Greece
- Coordinates: 37°25′N 22°1′E
- Country: Greece
- Administrative region: Peloponnese
- Regional unit: Arcadia
- Municipality: Megalopoli
- Municipal unit: Megalopoli

Population (2021)
  - Community: 51
- Time zone: UTC+2 (EET)
  - Summer (DST): UTC+3 (EEST)

Kastanochori (Greek: Καστανοχώρι meaning "chestnut village", before 1928: Κραμποβός - Krampovos) is a village in the municipality of Megalopoli, Arcadia, Greece. It is situated in the southeastern foothills of mount Lykaion, at about 750 m elevation. It is 2 km east of Lykaio, 3 km southwest of Isoma Karyon and 10 km west of Megalopoli.

== Population ==
| Year | Population |
|---|---|
| 1981 | 92 |
| 1991 | 101 |
| 2001 | 99 |
| 2011 | 94 |
| 2021 | 51 |

== See also ==
- List of settlements in Arcadia
