= Plaka, Arcadia =

Plaka Πλάκα
- Community
- Location within Greece
- Coordinates: 37°26′N 22°7′E
- Country: Greece
- Administrative region: Peloponnese
- Regional unit: Arcadia
- Municipality: Megalopoli
- Municipal unit: Megalopoli

Population (2021)
  - Community: 13
- Time zone: UTC+2 (EET)
  - Summer (DST): UTC+3 (EEST)

Plaka (Greek: Πλάκα) is a village in the municipality of Megalopoli, Arcadia, Greece. It is 1 km south of Soulos, 3 km northeast of Thoknia, 3 km southwest of Nea Ekklisoula and 4 km northwest of Megalopoli. The Greek National Road 76 (Megalopoli - Andritsaina - Krestena) passes east of the village. The Megalopoli Power Plant is located to the south and a large open-pit lignite mine is to the west.

== Population ==
Year	Population
1981	42
1991	105
2001	47
2011	54
2021	13

== See also ==
- List of settlements in Arcadia
