= Kastanochori =

Kastanochori or Kastanochorion may refer to the following places in Greece:

- Kastanochori, Arcadia, a village in the municipality Megalopoli, Arcadia
- Kastanochori, Serres, a village in the municipal unit Tragilos, Serres regional unit
