= Scirtonium =

Scirtonium or Skirtonion (Ancient Greek: Σκιρτώνιον) was a town of ancient Arcadia, in the region of Aegytis, to the south of Megalopolis. Its location is unknown.
