= Cnausum =

Cnausum or Knauson (Ancient Greek: Κναῦσον) was a town of ancient Arcadia, Greece, in the region of Eutresia. It was deserted in consequence of the removal of its inhabitants to Megalopolis. Its site is unlocated.
