= Acontium =

Ancient town

Acontium or Akontion (Ancient Greek: Ἀκόντιον) was a town of ancient Arcadia, in the district of Parrhasia. The people of Acontium moved to Megalopolis upon the founding of that city in 371 BCE.

Its site is unlocated.
