= Goupata =

Goupata may refer to:

- Goupata (mountain), a mountain in Argolis, Greece
- Goupata, Arcadia, a settlement in Arcadia, Greece
