= Carystus (Laconia) =

Ancient Town

Carystus or Karystos (Ancient Greek: Κάρυστος) was a town in ancient Laconia, in the district Aegytis, near the frontiers of Laconia. Its wine was celebrated by the poet Alcman. William Martin Leake, a 19th-century explorer and classicist, supposed that Carystus stood at the site known as "Huts of Giorgitzes" (Καλύβια Γιωργίτζη), but modern scholars treat its site as unlocated.
