= Neochori Falaisias =

Neochori Falaisias Νεοχώρι Φαλαισίας
- Community
- Location within Greece
- Coordinates: 37°11′N 22°14′E
- Country: Greece
- Administrative region: Peloponnese
- Regional unit: Arcadia
- Municipality: Megalopoli
- Municipal unit: Falaisia

Population (2021)
  - Community: 29
- Time zone: UTC+2 (EET)
  - Summer (DST): UTC+3 (EEST)

Neochori Falaisias (Greek: Νεοχώρι Φαλαισίας) is a mountain village in the municipal unit of Falaisia, Arcadia, Greece. It is situated in the northern part of the Taygetus mountains, at about 1200 m elevation. It is 3 km east of Dyrrachio, 4 km west of Georgitsi, 17 km southeast of Leontari and 26 km southeast of Megalopoli. It suffered damage from the 2007 Greek forest fires.

== Population ==
Year	Population
1981	95
1991	79
2001	111
2011	59
2021	29

== See also ==
- List of settlements in Arcadia
