= Choremis =

Choremis Χωρέμης
- Community
- Location within Greece
- Coordinates: 37°23′N 22°5′E
- Country: Greece
- Administrative region: Peloponnese
- Regional unit: Arcadia
- Municipality: Megalopoli
- Municipal unit: Megalopoli

Population (2021)
  - Community: 38
- Time zone: UTC+2 (EET)
  - Summer (DST): UTC+3 (EEST)

Choremis (Greek: Χωρέμης) is a village and a community of the municipality of Megalopoli, Arcadia, Greece. Since the 1970s it is situated on the left bank of the river Alfeios, which was rerouted for the lignite mines further east. It is 3 km northwest of Tripotamo, 4 km south of Thoknia and 5 km southwest of Megalopoli. The community consists of the villages Choremis and Apiditsa.

== Population ==
Year	Village population	Community population
1981	237	-
1991	112	-
2001	95	152
2011	22	54
2021	14	38

== See also ==
- List of settlements in Arcadia
