= Spaneika =

Spaneika or Spanaiika (Greek: Σπαναίικα) may refer to several places in Greece:

- Spaneika, Achaea, a settlement in the municipal unit Movri, Achaea
- Spaneika, Arcadia, a settlement in Arcadia
- Spaneika, Argolis, a settlement in the municipal unit Lyrkeia, Argolis
