= Soulari =

Soulari may refer to the following places in Greece:

- Soulari, Arcadia, a village in Arcadia
- Soullaroi, a village on the island Cephalonia
