= Leuctra (disambiguation) =

Leuctra is a town of ancient Boeotia, Greece.

Leuctra or Leuktra may also refer to:

- Leuctra (Arcadia), a town of ancient Arcadia, Greece
- Leuctra (Laconia), a town of ancient Laconia, Greece
- Leuctra (insect), a genus of insect
- Battle of Leuctra, 371 BCE, fought near the Boeotian Leuctra
