= Perivolia =

Perivolia may refer to several places in Greece and Cyprus:

- Perivolia, Arcadia, a village in Arcadia, part of Megalopoli
- Perivolia, Kissamos, a village in the Chania regional unit, part of Kissamos
- Perivolia, Rethymno, a village in the Rethymno regional unit, part of Rethymno
- Perivolia, Theriso, a village in the Chania regional unit, part of Theriso
- Perivolia, Elis, a village in Elis, part of Figaleia
- Perivolia, Laconia, a village in Laconia, part of Pellana
- Pervolia, a village near Larnaca, Cyprus, sometimes also spelt Perivolia

== See also ==
- Perivoli (disambiguation)
