= Perivoli =

Perivoli may refer to several places in Greece:

- Perivoli, Corfu, a village on Corfu
- Perivoli, Grevena, a municipal unit in Grevena regional unit
- Perivoli, Karditsa, a village in Karditsa regional unit, part of Argithea
- Perivoli, Phocis, a village in Phocis, part of Vardousia
- Perivoli Domokou, a village in Phthiotis, part of Xyniada
- Perivoli, Phthiotis, a village in Phthiotis, part of Spercheiada

== See also ==
- Perivolia (disambiguation)
