= Soulos =

Soulos Σούλος
- Community
- Location within Greece
- Coordinates: 37°26.5′N 22°6.7′E
- Country: Greece
- Administrative region: Peloponnese
- Regional unit: Arcadia
- Municipality: Megalopoli
- Municipal unit: Megalopoli

Population (2021)
  - Community: 20
- Time zone: UTC+2 (EET)
  - Summer (DST): UTC+3 (EEST)

Soulos (Greek: Σούλος) is a village in the municipality of Megalopoli, Arcadia, Greece. It is situated on a hillside, 1 km north of Plaka, 2 km southeast of Katsimpalis, 2 km west of Nea Ekklisoula and 5 km northwest of Megalopoli. The Greek National Road 76 (Megalopoli - Andritsaina - Krestena) passes east of the village.

== Population ==
Year	Population
1981	45
1991	66
2001	32
2011	13
2021	20

== See also ==
- List of settlements in Arcadia
