= Falaisia =

Falaisia Φαλαισία
- Municipal unit
- Location within the regional unit

- Location within Greece
- Coordinates: 37°17′N 22°10′E
- Country: Greece
- Administrative region: Peloponnese
- Regional unit: Arcadia
- Municipality: Megalopolis

Area
  - Municipal unit: 274.9 km^{2} (106.1 sq mi)
- Elevation: 758 m (2,487 ft)
- Highest elevation: 1,522 m (4,993 ft)
- Lowest elevation: 350 m (1,150 ft)

Population (2021)
  - Municipal unit: 1,455
  - Municipal unit density: 5.293/km^{2} (13.71/sq mi)
  - Community: 54
- Time zone: UTC+2 (EET)
  - Summer (DST): UTC+3 (EEST)
- Postal code: 220 21
- Area code: 27910
- Vehicle registration: TP
- Website: www.falaisia.gr

Falaisia (Greek: Φαλαισία, before 1918: Μπούρα - Boura) is a village and a former municipality in southwestern Arcadia, Peloponnese, Greece. Since the 2011 local government reform it is part of the municipality Megalopoli, of which it is a municipal unit. The municipal unit has an area of 274.926 km^{2}. The seat of the municipality was in Leontari, 5 km northwest of the village Falaisia. The municipal unit Falaisia is located in the northern foothills of the Taygetus mountains, south of Megalopoli and north of Kalamata. It borders on Laconia to the southeast, and Messenia to the southwest.

== Subdivisions ==
The municipal unit Falaisia is subdivided into the following communities (constituent villages in brackets):

- Akovos (Akovos, Goupata)
- Anavryto (Anavryto, Kato Anavryto)
- Anemodouri
- Dyrrachio
- Ellinitsa
- Falaisia (Falaisia, Moni Boura)
- Giannaioi (Ano Giannaioi, Kato Giannaioi)
- Graikos
- Kamara (Kamara, Kampochori)
- Leontari (Leontari, Gavria, Kalyvia, Kamaritsa, Kotsiridi)
- Leptini
- Neochori Falaisias
- Petrina (Petrina, Moni Ampelaki, Spanaiika)
- Potamia
- Routsi
- Skortsinos
- Soulari
- Tourkolekas
- Veligosti
- Voutsaras

== Historical population ==
| Year | Community | Municipal unit |
|---|---|---|
| 1920 | 375 | - |
| 1961 | 250 | - |
| 1981 | 100 | - |
| 1991 | 126 | 3,296 |
| 2001 | 150 | 3,229 |
| 2011 | 63 | 2,077 |
| 2021 | 54 | 1,455 |

== See also ==
- List of settlements in Arcadia
