= Fitokio =

- Settlement
- Location within Greece
- Coordinates: 40°13′23″N 21°20′24″E
- Country: Greece
- Geographic region: Macedonia
- Administrative region: Western Macedonia
- Regional unit: Kozani
- Municipality: Voio
- Municipal unit: Tsotyli
- Community: Anthochori

Population (2021)
  - Total: 18
- Time zone: UTC+2 (EET)
  - Summer (DST): UTC+3 (EEST)

Fitokio (Greek: Φυτώκιο), is a village in Kozani Regional Unit, Macedonia, Greece. It is part of the community of Anthochori.

Fitokio was a mixed village and a part of its population were Greek speaking Muslim Vallahades. The 1920 Greek census recorded 51 people in the village. Following the Greek–Turkish population exchange, Greek refugee families in Fitokio were from Pontus (26) in 1926. The 1928 Greek census recorded 124 village inhabitants. In 1928, the refugee families numbered 26 (86 people).
