= Parochthio =

- Settlement
- Location within Greece
- Coordinates: 40°14′20″N 21°22′46″E
- Country: Greece
- Geographic region: Macedonia
- Administrative region: Western Macedonia
- Regional unit: Kozani
- Municipality: Voio
- Municipal unit: Tsotyli
- Community: Anthochori

Population (2021)
  - Total: 0
- Time zone: UTC+2 (EET)
  - Summer (DST): UTC+3 (EEST)

Parochthio (Greek: Παρόχθιο, before 1927: Συγκόλιον – Sygkolion), is a village in Kozani Regional Unit, Macedonia, Greece. It is part of the community of Anthochori.

Sygkolion was a mixed village and a part of its population were Greek speaking Muslim Vallahades. Following the Greek–Turkish population exchange, Greek refugee families in Sygkolion were from Pontus (20) in 1926. The 1928 Greek census recorded 56 village inhabitants. In 1928, the refugee families numbered 20 (68 people).
