= Gefyra, Arcadia =

Gefyra Γέφυρα
- Community
- Location within Greece
- Coordinates: 37°21.7′N 22°8.6′E
- Country: Greece
- Administrative region: Peloponnese
- Regional unit: Arcadia
- Municipality: Megalopoli
- Municipal unit: Megalopoli

Population (2021)
  - Community: 26
- Time zone: UTC+2 (EET)
  - Summer (DST): UTC+3 (EEST)

Gefyra (Greek: Γέφυρα meaning "bridge") is a settlement in the municipality of Megalopoli, Arcadia, Greece. It is situated near the right bank of the river Alfeios, 4 km south of Megalopoli and 5 km north of Leontari. The Greek National Road 7 (Corinth - Tripoli - Kalamata) passes south of the village. There are large open-pit lignite mines to the northwest of the village. There are two beautiful churches: St. George in the village square, and St John at the eastern edge of the village.

== History ==
On August 30, 1944, the village was attacked by Nazi troops that were stationed in the nearby village of Anthochori. 12 male inhabitants of the village were massacred on that dreadful day including the village priest. The heroic 12 are remembered by a marble monument in the village square next to the Church of St. George. Gefyra suffered damage from the 2007 Greek forest fires.

== Population ==
Year	Population
1981	57
1991	73
2001	49
2011	30
2021	26

== See also ==
- List of settlements in Arcadia
