= Marathoussa =

Marathoussa Μαραθούσσα
- Settlement
- Location within Greece
- Coordinates: 37.41429°N 22.0925°E
- Country: Greece
- Administrative region: Peloponnese
- Regional unit: Arcadia
- Municipality: Megalopoli
- Municipal unit: Megalopoli

Population (2011)
  - Total: 32
- Time zone: UTC+2 (EET)
  - Summer (DST): UTC+3 (EEST)

Marathoussa (Greek: Μαραθούσσα, before 1927: Κασίμι - Kasimi) was a settlement but also a community northwest of Megalopolis, Greece in Arcadia. It was dissolved at the beginning of the 2000s, in order to use the lignite in its subsoil for the production of electricity at the Public Power Corporation steam power station in Megalopolis.

== Prehistoric history ==
During the mining operations, important findings of the Lower Paleolithic Period were identified in the area around the village. At a site in the area (Marathoussa 2), which dates back 450,000 years ago, evidence was discovered part of a hippopotamus skeleton with cut marks from stone tools, remains were discovered indicating that ancient human relatives killed and probably ate hippopotami. At another site (Marathoussa 1), traces of on-site construction of stone implements suitable for skinning and dismembering elephants were found, as well as traces of stone tool cuts on several of the elephant bones, suggesting that Marathoussa 1 was a "slaughter site".

== Population ==
The population censuses of the settlement from after World War II and until its dissolution are:

Year	Population
1951	221
1961	150
1971	109
1981	111
1991	70
2001	56
2011	32
