= Isaris =

Isaris Ίσαρης
- Community
- Location within Greece
- Coordinates: 37°22′N 22°1′E
- Country: Greece
- Administrative region: Peloponnese
- Regional unit: Arcadia
- Municipality: Megalopoli
- Municipal unit: Megalopoli

Population (2021)
  - Community: 105
- Time zone: UTC+2 (EET)
  - Summer (DST): UTC+3 (EEST)

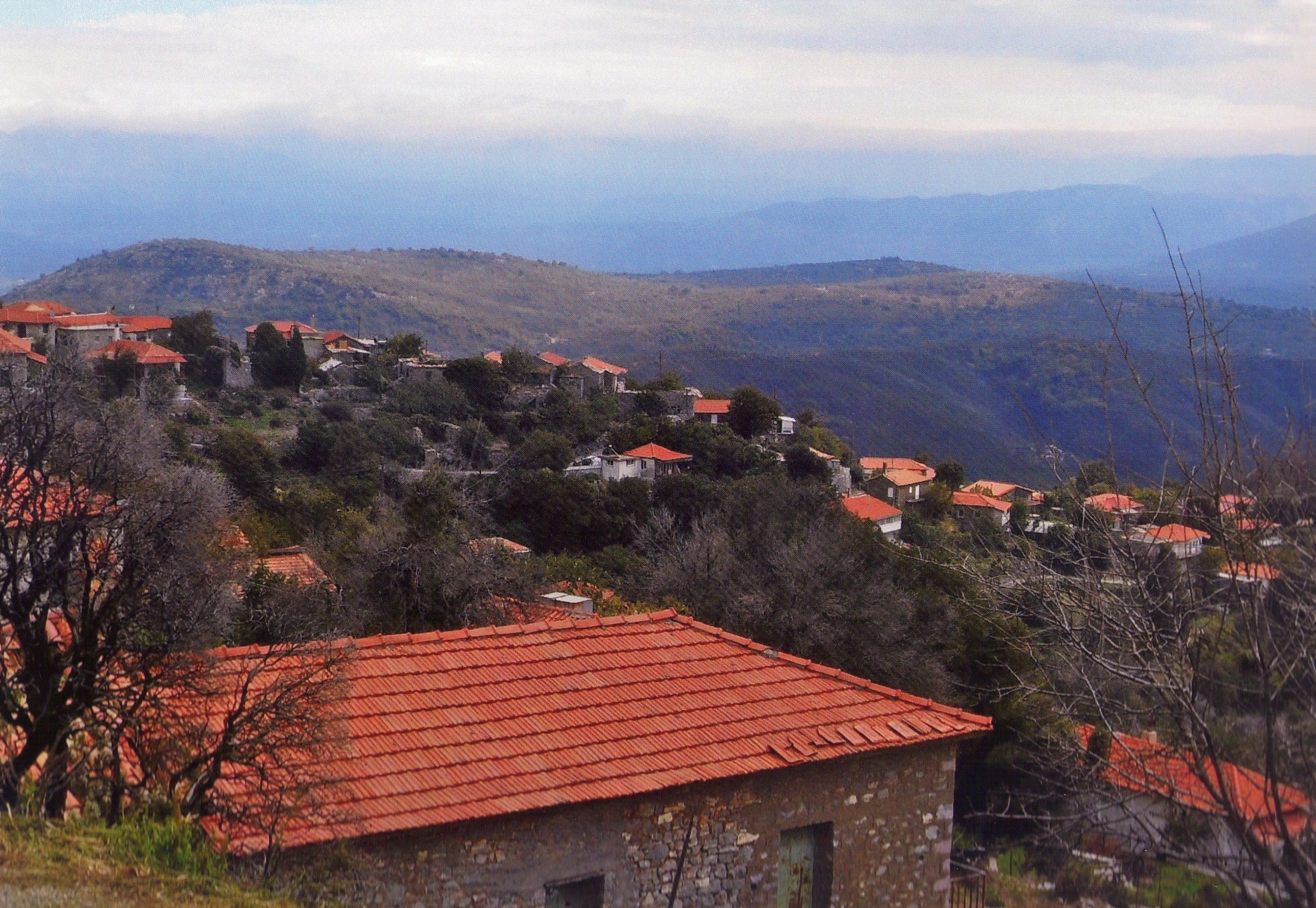
View of the village

Isaris (Greek: Ίσαρης) is a village and a community in the municipality of Megalopoli, Arcadia, Greece. It is situated in the mountains west of the Alfeios valley, at about 750 m elevation. It is considered a traditional settlement. It is 2 km east of Vastas, 5 km northwest of Chranoi and 11 km southwest of Megalopoli. The community includes the small villages Petrovouni and Chrousa.

== Topography ==
It is located 51 km west of Tripoli and 11 km southwest of Megalopolis. The settlement is built amphitheatrically on the eastern slopes of Mount Saint Ilias (Άγιος Ηλίας), providing a panoramic view of the Megalopolis plain to the northeast and the Messinian Valley to the south. The area is surrounded by a diverse mix of vegetation, including oak trees, chestnuts, holly, heather, and holm oaks. The railway station, which was situated a short distance from the main settlement, was a stop for trains on the Athens-Kalamata route from 1899 until the 1980s.

== History ==
The first known reference to the village comes from the Venetian traveler Pier Antonio Pacifico, who visited the area before 1686. Therefore, the establishment of the settlement dates back to at least the mid-17th century. The most likely origin of the name is from the Turkish word "hisar," meaning fortress. However, it is unclear whether the name was given due to its location in an inaccessible spot, resembling a fortress, or if a type of fortress had actually been built there at some point. Another possibility is that the name originates from the first settler's name. According to this second theory, during the regime of Ioannis Metaxas, the name was changed from "Isari" to "Isaris".

== Revolution of 1821 ==
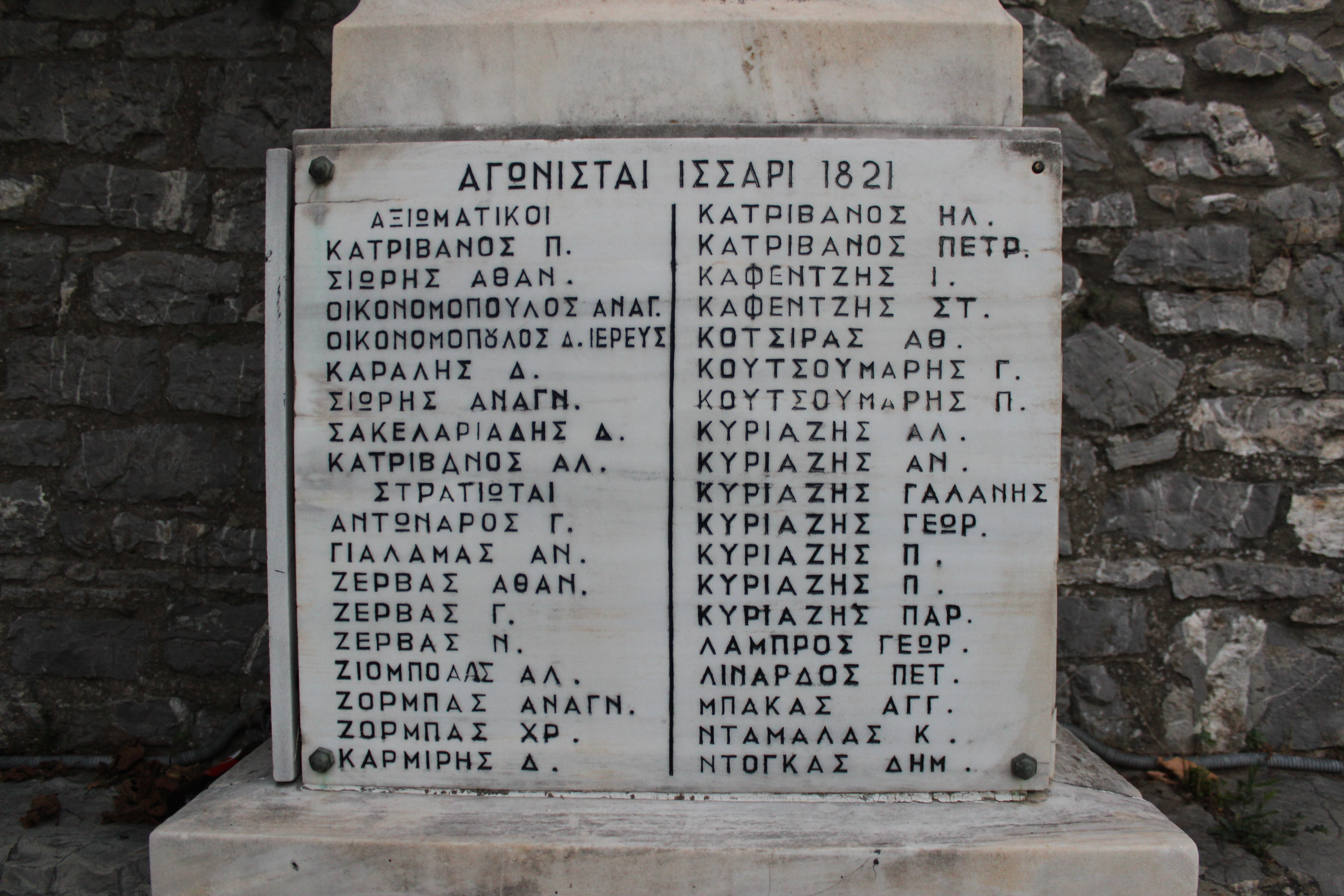
The Hero's Monument

Several accounts mention Isaris as a stronghold for klephts (bandits)(κλέφτες) and armatoloi (mounted militia)(αρματολοί) in the pre-revolutionary years (1770's - 1821). Many of the inhabitants of Isaris participated in various battles of 1821, with the most notable being Panagiotis Katrivanos (Παναγιώτης Κατριβάνος, 1784 - ?) and Athanasios Sioris (Αθανάσιος Σιώρης, 1756 - 1833) in the Battle of Valtetsi. A letter from Theodoros Kolokotronis, to General Sioris in Isaris on June 2, 1825, has been preserved.

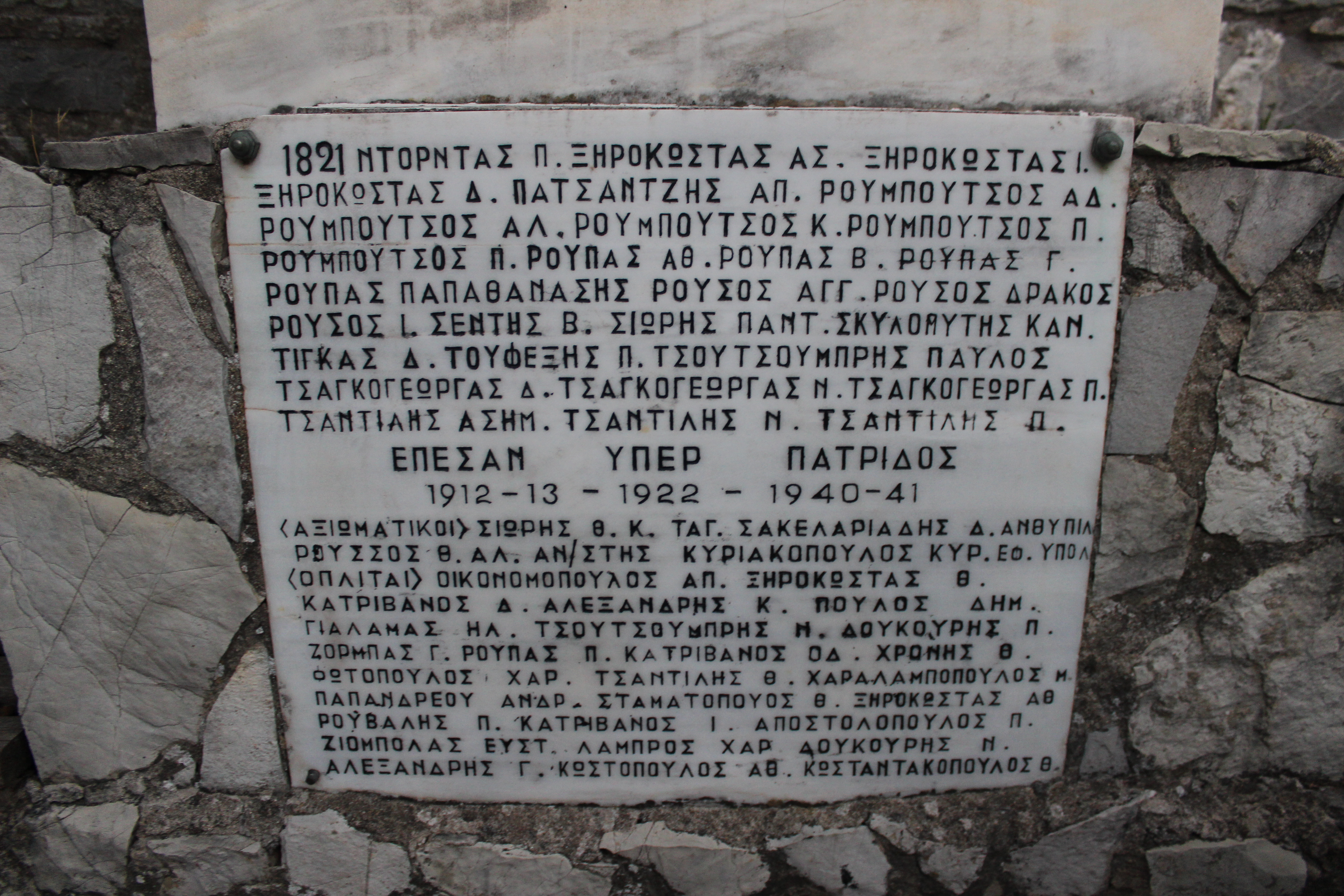
Hero's Monument (lower half)

A monument in the central plaza of the village was built in circa 1985.

The names of the brave Isaraians honored on the statue are (in order as they appear Top to down, and left to right):

5th Class Officers:

- Katrivanos, Panagiotis
- Sioris, Athanasios

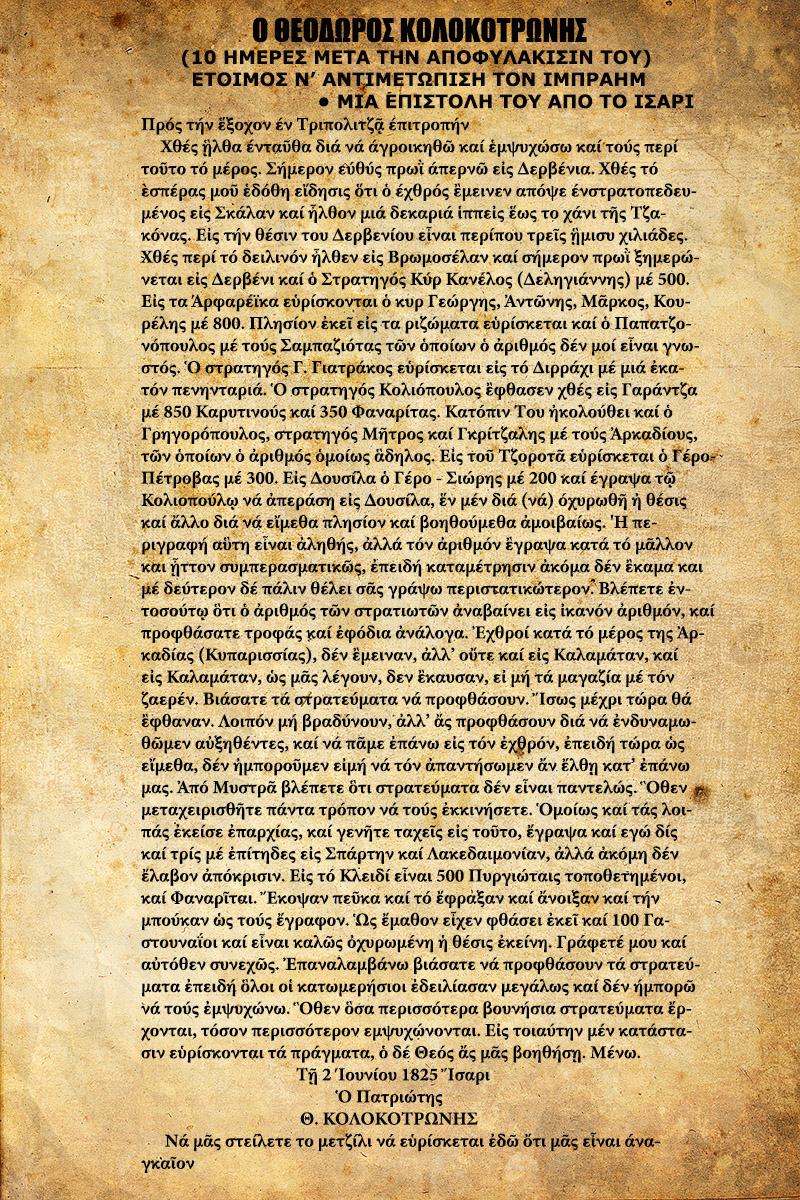
A letter sent from Theodoros Kolokotronis to General Athanasios Sioris

7th Class Officers:

- Oikonomopoulos, Anagnostos
- Oikonomopoulos, D. Iereus
- Karalis, Dimitrios
- Sioris, Anagnostos
- Sakelariadis, Dimitrios
- Katrivanos, Al.

Soldiers:

- Antonaros, G.
- Gialamas, Anastasios
- Zervas, Athanasios
- Zervas, G.
- Zervas, N.
- Ziompolas (Ziombolas), Alexios
- Zormpas (Zorbas), Anagnostos
- Zormpas (Zorbas), Christos
- Karmiris, D.
- Katrivanos, Ilias
- Katrivanos, Petros
- Kafentzis, I.
- Kafentzis, St.
- Kotsiras, Athanasios
- Koutsoumaris, Georgos
- Koutsoumaris, P.
- Kyriazis, Al.
- Kyriazis, An.
- Kyriazis, Galanis
- Kyriazis Georgos
- Kyriazis P.
- Kyriazis P.
- Kyriazis Par.
- Lampros, Georgos
- Linardos, Petros
- Mpakas (Bakas), Aggelos
- Ntamalas (Dalamas), K.
- Ntogkas (Dogas), Dimitrios

On lower half:

- Ntorntas, Petr.
- Xirokostas, Asimakis
- Xirokostas, Ioannis D.
- Xirokostas, D. K.
- Patsantzis, Apostolis
- Roumpoutsos, Adamakis
- Roumpoutsos, Al.
- Roumpoutsos, Konstantinos
- Roumpoutsos, Pan.
- Roumpoutsos, Panagos
- Roupas, Athanasios N.
- Roupas, V.
- Roupas, G.
- Roupas, Papathanasis
- Rousos, Aggelis
- Rousos, Drakos
- Rousos, Io.
- Sentis, V.
- Sioris, Pantelis Athanasios
- Skylomytis, Kanel.
- Tigkas, D.
- Toufexis, Panagos
- Tsoutsoumpris, Paulos
- Tsagkogeorgas, Demos
- Tsagkogeorgas, N. K.
- Tsagkogeorgas, Pan.
- Tsantilis, Asimakis
- Tsantilis, N.
- Tsantilis, Panagos

Officers:

- Sioris, Th. K. Tag.
- Sakelariadis, D.
- Rousos, Th. Al.
- Kyriakopoulos, Kyr.

The remaining soldiers listed on the lower half on the statue are:

- Oikonomopoulos, Ap.
- Xirokostas, Th.
- Katrivanos, D.
- Alexandris, K.
- Poulos, Dimitrios
- Gialamas, Ilias
- Tsoutsoumpris, N.
- Doukouris, P.
- Zormpas (Zorbas), G
- Roupas, P.
- Katrivanos, Od.
- Xronis (Chronis), Th
- Fotopoulos, Xar.
- Tsantilis, Th.
- Xaralampopoulos, M.
- Papandreou, Andr.
- Stamatopoulos, Th.
- Xirokostas, Athanasios
- Rouvalis, P.
- Katrivanos, I.
- Apostopoulos, P.
- Ziompolas, Evstathios
- Lampros, Xar.
- Doukouris, N.
- Alexandris, G.
- Kostopoulos, Athanasios
- Konstantakopoulos, Th.

Not listed but still remembered for their bravery:

- Fanariotis, G.
- Kotsiras, Athanasios
- Koutsioumaris, Pan.
- Kyriaris, Alexios
- Lampropoulos, Nik.
- Kyriazis, Pant.
- Kyriazis, Par. G.
- Papadopanagopoulos, Ilias

== The Battle of Isaris (7 August, 1825) ==
In early August 1825, Ibrahim dispatched a force of 3,500 soldiers to raid the area. The inhabitants of Isaris, after evacuating the women and children, fortified themselves in the village's central church. Their leader was General Athanasios Sioris. Though they numbered fewer than one hundred, they managed to hold out for the entire day. However, the enemy's numerical superiority was overwhelming. By the end of the day, they decided on a heroic exit, breaking through the enemy lines. Several, including their leader, were able to escape, taking refuge in nearby areas. The following day, Ibrahim's Turko-Albanian forces looted and burned the village.

== Administrative History ==
In 1834, the municipality of Lykosoura was established, with Isari as its capital. Over time, Isari became a regional commercial center, featuring schools, a post office, a gendarmerie (military-style police force), and at times serving as the seat of a Justice of the Peace and a Criminal Court. Despite its development in the 19th century, the area's barren and mountainous terrain meant that local incomes were insufficient, leading to a wave of emigration to America by the late 1800s.

In 1912, a reorganization of municipalities and communities led to the creation of the Community of Isari. The 1920 census recorded 1,214 residents. In 1940, the village was officially renamed Isaris. Continued emigration and urbanization resulted in a steady decline in population, with the 1961 census recording only 434 residents.

Isaris remained an independent community until the implementation of the Kapodistrias Plan, when it became a municipal district of Megalopolis. Under the Kallikratis Program, it was fully incorporated into the Municipality of Megalopolis. By the 2011 census, the population had decreased to just 86 residents.

== Public Education ==
The Isaris Elementary School began operating in the mid-19th century. It later acquired its own building through a donation from Andreas Syggrou, located at Michou t' aloni. In 1876, a School Board was established, which remained in operation until 1930.

A separate elementary school for girls was founded in 1890 and was housed in the building that later became the community hall. The two elementary schools operated separately until 1930 when, due to an educational reform, a new, imposing school building was constructed at Ampara, funded by Isaraian immigrants in America. This led to the creation of a single coeducational elementary school.

Due to a decline in student enrollment, the school ceased operations in the 1970s.

== Churches and Chapels ==
The main church of Isaris is Agios Nikolaos, or Saint Nicholas, a church with a simple and austere exterior and a richly decorated interior. With funds from expatriate Isaraians, it was adorned with marble doors and windows, and the iconostasis was gilded. The old church was destroyed during the Battle of Isaris.

Shortly before reaching the village, visitors encounter the smaller chapel of Agios Nikolaos in Kotronia (built in 1893), which celebrates its feast day on May 9, when a large festival is organized.

Other chapels include Agios Vasilis, Agios Ilias, Agios Athanasios, Agios Georgios, Agios Dimitrios, the Holy Apostles, Panagitsa, Agios Nektarios, Agia Paraskevi, Agia Kyriaki, Agios Andreas, Agia Varvara, and Agios Petros (located in the cemetery).

== Attractions in the wider area ==
7 kilometers north of Isaris lies the archaeological site of the ancient Arcadian city of Lykosoura. There are panoramic views of the Megalopolis plain and Messinian basin from the top of Mount Lykaion.

The first village one encounters west of Isaris is Vastas, Arcadia, where the famous 11th-century chapel of Agia Theodora is located. It attracts many visitors due to the remarkable phenomenon of 17 towering trees growing from its roof.

== Notable Figures ==
Yannis Xerokostas (1890–1967), abstract painter, known professionally as John Xeron. He immigrated to the United States in 1904 and studied at the Corcoran School of Art. He worked at the Guggenheim Museum as a security guard for 28 years from 1939 to his death. He is described as a "pioneer of non-objective painting" by the Smithsonian Archives of American Art. His works are in the collections of the Smithsonian American Art Museum and the Hirshhorn Museum and Sculpture Garden.

Yannis Tsantilis, silent film actor who worked in Hollywood under the name John Belasco.

Angelos Koutsoumaris (1896–1985), became an Areopagite (high-ranking judge within the Greek judicial system). He was the son of Ioannis Koutsoumaris, the last mayor of Lykosoura before the 1912 administrative reorganization, and the grandson of Angelis Koutsoumaris, also a mayor of Lykosoura.

In 1943, as the president of the Court of First Instance and head of the Court of First Instance of Thessaloniki, Angelos Koutsoumaris attempted to save 400 Jewish children from Thessaloniki from being deported to concentration camps. His efforts were ultimately unsuccessful, though historical research continues to investigate whether some children—especially those from the early days of the rescue operation—were saved. For his actions, he was posthumously honored by the Jewish Community of Thessaloniki.

Emmanuel I. Vouzikas, lawyer and professor of Civil Law at the University of Athens Law School, where he served as Rector from 1981 to 1982.

== Environmental Issues ==
The impacts on the ecosystem of the area from the operation of the power plant and the associated lignite mine in neighboring Megalopolis remain unknown. One of the three air pollution monitoring stations has been installed in Isaris (the other two are in Leontari and Elliniko) but there are still no firm conclusions from the studies that have been carried out.

== Population ==
Year	Population village	Population community
1981	–	368
1991	236	–
2001	218	263
2011	86	140
2021	80	105

== See also ==
- List of settlements in Arcadia
- List of traditional settlements of Greece
