= Spanaiika =

Spanaiika Σπαναίικα
- Settlement
- Location within Greece
- Coordinates: 37°16.5′N 22°11.9′E
- Country: Greece
- Administrative region: Peloponnese
- Regional unit: Arcadia
- Municipality: Megalopoli
- Municipal unit: Falaisia
- Community: Petrina

Population (2021)
  - Total: 16
- Time zone: UTC+2 (EET)
  - Summer (DST): UTC+3 (EEST)

Spanaiika (Greek: Σπαναίικα, also Σπανεϊκα - Spaneika) is a village in Arcadia, Greece. It is part of the community of Petrina. It is situated in the northern foothills of the Taygetus mountains, 1.5 km southwest of Petrina, 3 km southeast of Falaisia and 15 km southeast of Megalopoli.

== Population ==
Year	Population
1991	52
2001	36
2011	21
2021	16

== See also ==
- List of settlements in Arcadia
