= Kato Karyes =

Kato Karyes Κάτω Καρυές
- Community
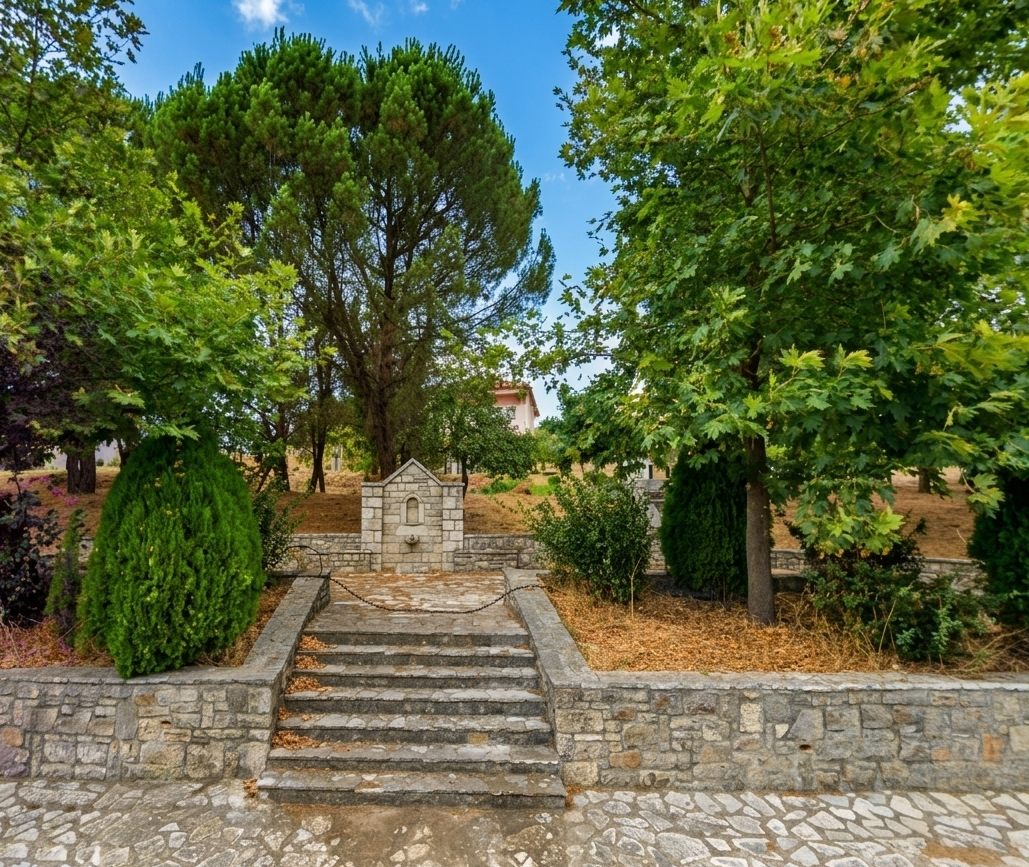
- Spring of Kato Karyes Village

- Location within Greece
- Coordinates: 37°25′N 22°3.5′E
- Country: Greece
- Administrative region: Peloponnese
- Regional unit: Arcadia
- Municipality: Megalopoli
- Municipal unit: Megalopoli

Population (2021)
  - Community: 31
- Time zone: UTC+2 (EET)
  - Summer (DST): UTC+3 (EEST)

Kato Karyes (Greek: Κάτω Καρυές, before 1976: Καλύβια Καρυών - Kalyvia Karyon) is a village in the municipality of Megalopoli, Arcadia, Greece. It is situated near the left bank of the river Alfeios. It is 2 km southeast of Isoma Karyon, 2 km west of Thoknia and 7 km northwest of Megalopoli. There is a power plant and several open-pit lignite mines east of the village.

== Population ==
Year	Population
1981	88
1991	89
2001	51
2011	61
2021	31

== See also ==
- List of settlements in Arcadia
