= Chirades =

Chirades Χιράδες
- Community
- Location within Greece
- Coordinates: 37°17′N 22°4′E
- Country: Greece
- Administrative region: Peloponnese
- Regional unit: Arcadia
- Municipality: Megalopoli
- Municipal unit: Megalopoli

Population (2021)
  - Community: 69
- Time zone: UTC+2 (EET)
  - Summer (DST): UTC+3 (EEST)

Chirades (Greek: Χιράδες, locally known as Kyrades) is a mountain village in southwestern Arcadia, Greece. It is located in the mountains on the border with Messenia, at about 800 m elevation. It is 2 km east of Souli, 4 km south of Paradeisia, 6 km northwest of Tourkolekas and 14 km southwest of Megalopoli. Chirades suffered damage from the 2007 Greek forest fires.

== Population ==
Year	Population
1981	198
1991	167
2001	186
2011	80
2021	69

== See also ==
- List of settlements in Arcadia
