= Neo Chorio =

Neo Chorio (lit. "new village" in Greek) may refer to:

- Neo Chorio, Nicosia, a village in northern Cyprus
- Neo Chorio, Paphos, a village in western Cyprus
- Neo Chorio, Crete, a village in Crete, Greece

== See also ==
- Neochori (disambiguation)
