= Aegys =

Town of ancient Arcadia and Laconia

Coordinates: 37°14′47″N 22°09′56″E

Aegys or Aigys (Ancient Greek: Αἴγυς or Αἶγυς) was a town of ancient Arcadia then of ancient Laconia, on the frontiers of the two regions. It originally belonged to the Arcadians, but was conquered at an early period by Charilaus, the reputed nephew of Lycurgus, and annexed to Laconia. Its territory, called Aegytis or Aigytis (Αἰγῦτις), appears to have been originally of some extent, and to have included all the villages in the districts of Maleatis and Cromitis. Even at the time of the foundation of Megalopolis in 371 BCE, the inhabitants of these Arcadian districts, comprising Scirtonium, Malea, Cromi, Belbina, and Leuctrum, continued to be called Aegytae.

Its site is tentatively located west of the modern Kamara.
