= Vastas =

Vastas Βάστας
- Community
- Location within Greece
- Coordinates: 37°22′N 21°59′E
- Country: Greece
- Administrative region: Peloponnese
- Regional unit: Arcadia
- Municipality: Megalopoli
- Municipal unit: Megalopoli

Population (2021)
  - Community: 45
- Time zone: UTC+2 (EET)
  - Summer (DST): UTC+3 (EEST)

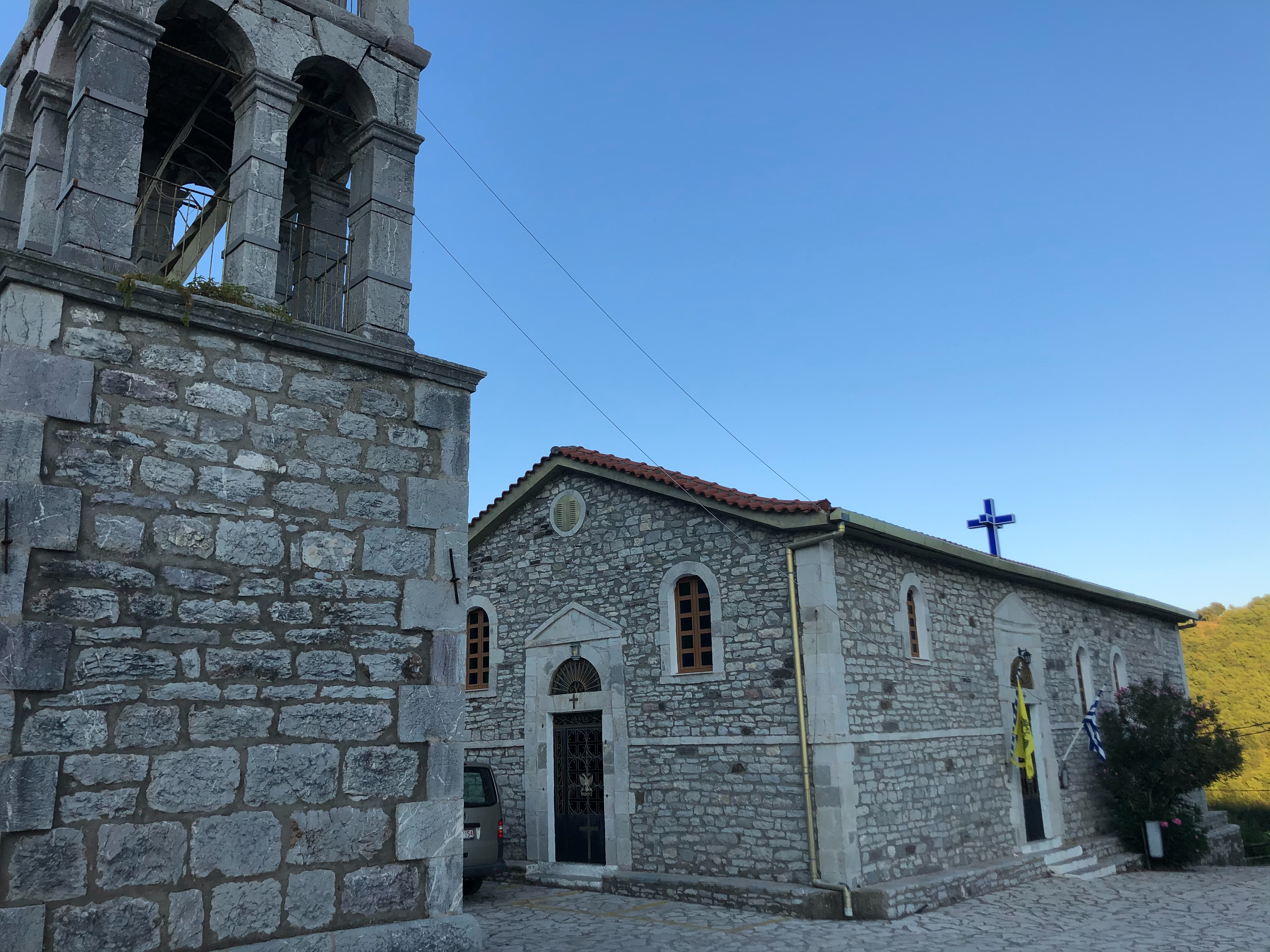
Church at Vastas, Arcadia, Greece.

Vastas (Greek: Βάστας, also Βάστα Vasta) is a village in the municipality of Megalopoli, Arcadia, Greece. It is situated on a mountainside near the border with Messenia, at about 850 m elevation. It is known for its "miracle church" of Saint Theodora. Vastas is 2 km west of Isaris, 6 km northeast of Kato Melpeia (Messenia), 6 km northwest of Chranoi and 14 km west of Megalopoli.

== Population ==
Year	Population
1981	139
1991	95
2001	147
2011	62
2021	45

== Saint Theodora ==
Vastas is best known for its "miracle church" of Saint Theodora of Vasta, who was an 11th-century Byzantine citizen. When the area was raided by bandits, Theodora was determined to help defend her village, but as a woman it was unthinkable to do so. Not to be deterred, Theodora secretly disguised herself as a male soldier in order to join the defense. Unfortunately, Theodora did not survive, and as she lay dying she uttered the following words:

Let my body become a church
My blood a river
My hair the forest

The villagers, moved by her bravery and her untimely demise, built a church at the site of her grave. Legend has it that a local river re-routed to pass directly under the church. Eventually, trees sprouted from the roof of the church, the roots of which are not visible under the roof and neither inside nor outside the church. Currently the church has 17 enormous holly and maple trees growing on its roof. Most of them are taller than 30 meters. Saint Theodora has become an important saint of the Greek Orthodox Church and the site has become important for religious pilgrims and sightseers alike.

== The solved mystery of the trees ==
Researchers from the University of Patras, in Greece, have studied the structure and had the following comments:

... its story in general....involves a "miracle". .... The geophysical team of the University of Patras tried to add to the restoration of this protected building. .... seventeen large trees and several smaller have grown on the roof of the building. The problem that had to be dealt with concerning the trees on the roof was to find out where their roots were directed without provoking the religious feeling of the church people and the clergymen that were our "sleepless guardians" throughout the entire survey. After an onsite estimation of the situation it was decided that the high-frequency georadar would be used on the walls of the building together with electrical tomography using very small electrodes, so as to have a double check on the methodology. The results of the investigation threw ample light to the mystery and gave the Directorate for the Restoration of Byzantine and Post-Byzantine Monuments all the answers they needed to proceed safely with the restoration of the church of St. Theodora. It was proved that the roots follow the gaps existing inside the side stonemasonry walls creating repulsion stresses between the stones and thus they reach the ground. This leads to the creation of a net of roots that reinforces the building from a static point of view opposing the roof load but is also destroying the stone walls. It was also proved that there are fewer problems in the north wall while there seem to be many voids in the south wall.

== The "three wonders of Vasta" ==
=== The unexplored ancient caverns ===
The Church of St. Theodora sits on top of large unexplored caverns. About 40 years ago, a local land owner, Mitsios Papakostantinou, found three small statues in the caverns. The statues were claimed by the Archaeological Museum of Sparta.

=== Kolokotroni's footprint ===
On the northwestern side of the village, there rests a big limestone with a perfect fossil foot print on it. The older villagers tell the legend of the Father of the Greek Independence Revolution of 1821, Kolokotronis. They say that Kolokotronis and his fellow riders used to use that spot as an observation point for approaching Turks. One day, when Kolokotronis dismounted from his horse, his foot left an imprint upon the rock.

=== The spring of Apollo ===
The spring on top of Mount Tetrazion, the village's highest point, has water so cold that it's very hard for anyone to keep a hand in it for more than 40 seconds. The legend has it that the god Apollo used to refresh himself at this spring as his temple is in sight at the mountain top on the west side below.

== Notable people ==
- Vasilis Papakonstantinou (born 1950), singer, musician and songwriter

== See also ==
- List of settlements in Arcadia
