= Leuctra (Arcadia) =

Town of Aegytis on the confines of Arcadia and Laconia

Coordinates: 37°19′19″N 22°08′35″E

Leuctra or Leuktra (Ancient Greek: τὰ Λεῦκτρα) or Leuctrum or Leuktron (τὸ Λεῦκτρον) was a town of Aegytis on the confines of Arcadia and Laconia, described by Thucydides as on the confines of Laconia toward Mount Lycaeus, and by Xenophon. It was originally an Arcadian town, but was included in the territory of Laconia. It commanded one of the passes leading into Laconia, by which a portion of the Theban army penetrated into the country on their first invasion under Epaminondas. It was detached from Sparta by Epaminondas, and added to the territory of Megalopolis. It appears to have stood on the direct road from Sparta to Megalopolis.

Leuctra's site is located near modern Leontari.
