= Skortsinos =

Skortsinos Σκορτσινός
- Community
- Location within Greece
- Coordinates: 37°18′N 22°15′E
- Country: Greece
- Administrative region: Peloponnese
- Regional unit: Arcadia
- Municipality: Megalopoli
- Municipal unit: Falaisia

Population (2021)
  - Community: 128
- Time zone: UTC+2 (EET)
  - Summer (DST): UTC+3 (EEST)

Skortsinos (Greek: Σκορτσινός) is a village in the municipal unit Falaisia, Arcadia, Greece. It is situated on a hillside south of the mountain Tsemperou, close to the border with Laconia. It is 5 km southeast of Voutsaras, 7 km north of Longanikos and 15 km southeast of Megalopoli. The karstic spring of the river Evrotas is 1.7 km south of Skortsinos.

== Population ==
Year	Population
1991	219
2001	220
2011	139
2021	128

== See also ==
- List of settlements in Arcadia
