= Chranoi =

Chranoi Χράνοι
- Community
- Location within Greece
- Coordinates: 37°19′N 22°2′E
- Country: Greece
- Administrative region: Peloponnese
- Regional unit: Arcadia
- Municipality: Megalopoli
- Municipal unit: Megalopoli

Population (2021)
  - Community: 119
- Time zone: UTC+2 (EET)
  - Summer (DST): UTC+3 (EEST)
- Website: http://xranoi-arkadias.gr/el/

Chranoi (Greek: Χράνοι - Greek pronunciation: [xraˈni]) is a village in the municipality of Megalopoli, southwest Arcadia, Greece. It is located in the mountains on the border with Messenia, at about 500 m elevation. It is 4 km west Paradeisia, 5 km southeast of Isaris, and 13 km southwest of Megalopoli. The railway from Corinth to Kalamata passes through the village.

== Population ==
Year	Population
1981	314
1991	286
2001	331
2011	137
2021	119

== Name and history ==
The name Chranoi (Χράνοι) probably derives from the Slavic word Hrana (Хpaнa) which literally means 'crop', probably in relation to the village's agricultural nature. This name, along with other Slavic village names, like Andravida, is proof of Slavic presence in the Peloponnese during the Middle Ages, though the extent of said presence is unknown. Chranoi and the area around it has been inhabited since at least the 15th century.

Chranoi was originally several smaller villages which grew together and eventually joined into one, according to local accounts. As part of Charilaos Trikoupis' construction projects a bridge and railroad station with trucks running through the village were built. It cut the village into Upper Chranoi and Lower Chranoi, area terms still used today by the locals. During World War II it was occupied by the Italians and many villagers joined the resistance with the National Liberation Front (Greece). The villagers managed to convince the local Italian garrison, which was guarding its strategic bridge, to join them in the guerilla warfare against the Nazi occupation, telling them that the Germans would otherwise kill them because of Italy's surrender. During the Civil War many joined the Democratic Army of Greece as well as the Royal Hellenic Army. The village had a relatively large and growing population compared to smaller villages up until the 1960s. Like most of Arcadia, its population starting falling due to the large waves of migration of Arcadian Greeks to major Greek cities, like Athens, and to foreign countries, particularly North American ones.

== See also ==
- List of settlements in Arcadia
