= Isari, Afghanistan =

Isari Īsāṟī
- Location in Afghanistan
- Coordinates: 37°8′33″N 70°31′32″E
- Country: Afghanistan
- Province: Badakhshan Province
- District: Argo
- Time zone: + 4.30

Isari is a village in Badakhshan Province in northeastern Afghanistan.
