= Isoma Karyon =

Isoma Karyon Ίσωμα Καρυών
- Community
- Location within Greece
- Coordinates: 37°26′N 22°3′E
- Country: Greece
- Administrative region: Peloponnese
- Regional unit: Arcadia
- Municipality: Megalopoli
- Municipal unit: Megalopoli

Population (2021)
  - Community: 14
- Time zone: UTC+2 (EET)
  - Summer (DST): UTC+3 (EEST)

Isoma Karyon (Greek: Ίσωμα Καρυών) is a village in the municipality of Megalopoli, Arcadia, Greece. It is situated in the eastern foothills of mount Lykaion, at 470 m elevation. It is 2 km northwest of Kato Karyes, 6 km south of Karytaina and 8 km northwest of Megalopoli.

== Population ==
Year	Population
1981	144
1991	168
2001	115
2011	14
2021	14

== See also ==
- List of settlements in Arcadia
