= Tripotamo, Arcadia =

Tripotamo Τριπόταμο
- Community
- Location within Greece
- Coordinates: 37°21.7′N 22°6′E
- Country: Greece
- Administrative region: Peloponnese
- Regional unit: Arcadia
- Municipality: Megalopoli
- Municipal unit: Megalopoli
- Elevation: 400 m (1,300 ft)

Population (2021)
  - Community: 15
- Time zone: UTC+2 (EET)
  - Summer (DST): UTC+3 (EEST)
- Postal code: 222 00
- Area code: 27910

Tripotamo (Greek: Τριπόταμο meaning "three rivers", before 1927: Δεδέρμπεη - Dedermpei) is a village in the municipality of Megalopoli in the southwestern part of Arcadia, Greece. It is situated on the right bank of the rerouted Alfeios river, near its confluence with two smaller tributaries. It is 3 km southeast of Choremis, 3 km northeast of Neochori Lykosouras, 4 km northwest of Veligosti and 5 km southwest of Megalopoli. There is a large open-pit lignite mine to the northeast.

== Historical population ==
Year	Population
1920	485
1961	225
1981	129
1991	181
2001	85
2011	89
2021	15

== See also ==
- List of settlements in Arcadia
