= Anthochori, Kozani =

Anthochori Ανθοχώρι
- Community
- Location within Greece
- Coordinates: 40°14′13″N 21°20′52″E
- Country: Greece
- Administrative region: Western Macedonia
- Regional unit: Kozani
- Municipality: Voio
- Municipal unit: Tsotyli

Population (2021)
  - Community: 71
- Time zone: UTC+2 (EET)
  - Summer (DST): UTC+3 (EEST)
- Postal code: 50002
- Area code: +30 2468

Anthochori (Greek: Ανθοχώρι, before 1954: Τσακνοχώριον – Tsaknochorion), is a village in the municipal unit of Tsotyli, Kozani regional unit, Greece. It is situated at an altitude of 670 meters. The population was 71 at the 2021 census. The community consists of the villages Anthochori, Parochthio and Fitokio.

Tsaknochorion was a mixed village and a part of its population were Greek speaking Muslim Vallahades. The 1920 Greek census recorded 354 people in the village, and 300 inhabitants (30 families) were Muslim in 1923. Following the Greek–Turkish population exchange, Greek refugee families in Tsaknochorion were from Pontus (23) in 1926. The 1928 Greek census recorded 292 village inhabitants. In 1928, the refugee families numbered 23 (83 people).
