= Megalopoli Power Plant =

Power plant in Greece

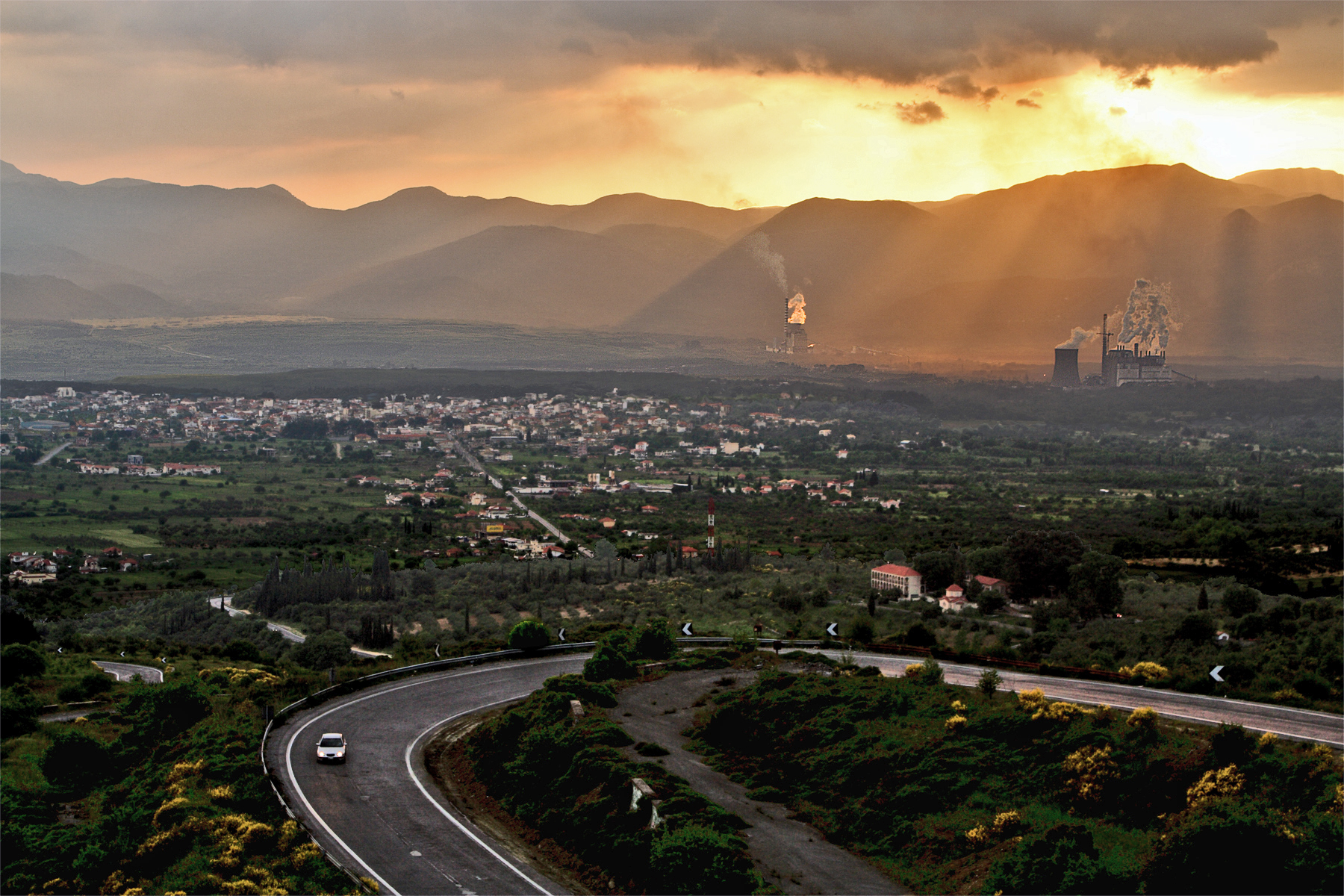
- Megalopoli Power Plant (background).
- Country: Greece
- Location: Arcadia
- Coordinates: 37.4177°N 22.1075°E
- Status: Operational
- Commission date: 1971
- Owner: DEH
- Operator: Public Power Corporation

Thermal power station
- Primary fuel: Coal

Power generation
- Nameplate capacity: 850 MW

The Megalopoli Power Plant is an 850 MW power plant in Arcadia in the central Peloponnese that produces electricity for southern Greece and the islands. It is located 5 kilometres (3.1 mi) northwest of Megalopoli via the EO76 road (Krestena - Andritsaina - Megalopoli), its entrance is 1 kilometre (0.62 mi) to the east. It produces electricity from coal and lignite mined south in the Megalopoli Mine as well as mines in Thoknia and Kyparissia. The plant employs up to 500 to 1,000 people, most of them are from Megalopoli.

Construction began in the mid-1960s just after the town was struck by the Arcadia earthquake in 1965. It took three to four years to complete. By 1971, electricity production began and mining also started. As all of its coal and lignite are being used up, the plant may close in a few years, potentially laying off hundreds of workers and causing a significant part of its economy to drop.

The power plant had been featured in an ERT documentary which was broadcast in April 2007.

== Location ==
The plant is surrounded by Megalopoli's nearby forest to the southwest, the Alpheus River to the west and another to the north. The building is in the middle part, its towers are to the southwest and its reactors to the east. The plant can be seen around the valley, the Lykaio mountains to the north, its mountains to the north, the east and the west.

== Environment ==
Pollution has been a problem in the area as sulphur and carbon dioxide (CO_{2}) have been emptied as low as 200 m (660 ft) during windy and cloudy days and as high as 1 km (0.62 mi) during clear days, visible from as far as 20 km (12 mi) as well as northwestern Laconia. The main concern is dumping used-up coal into the Alfeios which ruins its water supply and nature as well as the ancient city of Megalopoli which saw marble and stone begin to rust. Also, as with all fossil fuel based plants, the Megalopoli Power Plant produces large amounts of greenhouse gases that contribute to climate change.

=== Emission data ===
Greenhouse gas emissions as verified by the EU Emission Trading Scheme (in tCO_{2}e)
| Units | 2008 | 2009 | 2010 | 2011 | 2012 | 2013 | 2014 |
|---|---|---|---|---|---|---|---|
| Megalopoli A (I-III) | 5,300,608 | 4,461,751 | 3,422,835 | 3,076,864 | 3,237,667 | 2,402,432 | 2,782,295 |
| Megalopoli B (IV) | 2,190,791 | 2,914,168 | 2,694,745 | 3,009,880 | 2,658,081 | 2,847,872 | 2,418,698 |
Data: European Commission, 2015

== See also ==
- List of power stations in Greece
- Energy in Greece
