= Voutsaras, Arcadia =

Voutsaras Βουτσαράς
- Community
- Location within Greece
- Coordinates: 37°19.5′N 22°12.4′E
- Country: Greece
- Administrative region: Peloponnese
- Regional unit: Arcadia
- Municipality: Megalopoli
- Municipal unit: Falaisia

Population (2021)
  - Community: 42
- Time zone: UTC+2 (EET)
  - Summer (DST): UTC+3 (EEST)

Voutsaras (Greek: Βουτσαράς, before 1918: Ζαΐμη - Zaimi) is a village in the municipal unit of Falaisia in Arcadia, Greece. It is situated in low hills, 11 km southeast of Megalopoli. It is 3 km southwest of Anavryto, 5 km east of Leontari and 5 km northwest of Skortsinos.

== Population ==
| Year | Population |
|---|---|
| 1981 | 96 |
| 1991 | 75 |
| 2001 | 90 |
| 2011 | 47 |
| 2021 | 42 |

== See also ==
- List of settlements in Arcadia

== Notable people ==
- John (Stavropoulos) Stevens, American award winning Architect
