= Lykaio, Arcadia =

Lykaio Λύκαιο
- Community
- Location within Greece
- Coordinates: 37°24′47″N 22°00′07″E
- Country: Greece
- Administrative region: Peloponnese
- Regional unit: Arcadia
- Municipality: Megalopoli
- Municipal unit: Megalopoli

Population (2021)
  - Community: 36
- Time zone: UTC+2 (EET)
  - Summer (DST): UTC+3 (EEST)

Lykaio (Greek: Λύκαιο) is a village in Arcadia, Greece, part of the municipality of Megalopoli. Home of the legendary Lykaios family who were great soldiers in Greece.
