= Dyrrachio =

Dyrrachio Δυρράχιο
- Community
- Location within Greece
- Coordinates: 37°11′N 22°12′E
- Country: Greece
- Administrative region: Peloponnese
- Regional unit: Arcadia
- Municipality: Megalopoli
- Municipal unit: Falaisia
- Elevation: 800 m (2,600 ft)

Population (2021)
  - Community: 134
- Time zone: UTC+2 (EET)
  - Summer (DST): UTC+3 (EEST)
- Postal code: 220 21

Dyrrachio (Greek: Δυρράχιο) is a mountain village in the municipal unit of Falaisia, southwestern Arcadia, Greece. It is considered a traditional settlement and is situated at an altitude of 800 metres (2,600 ft) in the Taygetos mountains of the Peloponnese. It is 3 km west of Neochori, 4 km east of Akovos, 7 km southwest of Longanikos and 25 km south of Megalopoli. Dyrrachio suffered damage from the 2007 Greek forest fires.

== History ==
Historical references attest to the existence of Dyrrachio across several centuries. Mentions appear in Byzantine sources, including a 5th-century entry in a Byzantine lexicon titled Dyrrachio, a 14th-century chrysobull of Andronikos II Palaiologos referring to the settlement as an ancient city, and writings of the 15th-century historian George Sphrantzes. Later references include an inscription from the Monastery of Rekitsa (1714) and letters from the metropolitan bishop of Monemvasia concerning the bishop of Dyrrachio in 1718 and 1742.

In the late 18th century, the area was associated with the klepht leader Zacharias Barbitsiotis, who operated in the region after a victory at Rekitsa. By the early 19th century, the village became involved in preparations for the Greek War of Independence, and figures from the area participated in the struggle, including Panagiotis Kefalas, known for his role in the capture of Tripolitsa in 1821.

During the 19th century, many inhabitants worked as millers, operating watermills in parts of the Peloponnese, particularly from about 1850 to 1920. From the late 19th century, migration to the United States and to cities such as Athens and Kalamata contributed to population decline.

In 1834, after Greek independence, Dyrrachio became a separate municipality. Residents later participated in several conflicts involving Greece, including the Greco-Turkish War of 1897, the First Balkan War, the First World War, and the Greco-Italian War. During the Axis occupation of Greece, the village was involved in resistance activity and suffered damage. Post-war reconstruction followed.

Administrative changes in the 20th century included the establishment of the Community of Dyrrachio on 24 August 1912, with the settlement of Dyrrachio as its seat. The settlement of Neochori Falaisias was initially included, but was separated on 19 April 1930 to form the Community of Neochori Falaisias.

== Population ==
Year	Settlement population
1981	345
1991	255
2001	299
2011	114
2021	134

== See also ==
- List of settlements in Arcadia
- List of traditional settlements of Greece
