= Perivolia, Arcadia =

Perivolia Περιβόλια
- Community
- Location within Greece
- Coordinates: 37°23.2′N 22°9.5′E
- Country: Greece
- Administrative region: Peloponnese
- Regional unit: Arcadia
- Municipality: Megalopoli
- Municipal unit: Megalopoli
- Elevation: 420 m (1,380 ft)

Population (2021)
  - Community: 77
- Time zone: UTC+2 (EET)
  - Summer (DST): UTC+3 (EEST)
- Postal code: 222 00
- Area code: 27910

Perivolia (Greek: Περιβόλια, before 1926: Ρουσβάναγα - Rousvanaga) is a village and a community in the southwestern part of Arcadia, Greece. It is part of the municipality of Megalopoli, located in a rural area 3 km (2 mi) south-east of downtown Megalopoli. The Greek National Road 7/E55 (Corinth - Tripoli - Kalamata passes southeast of the village. The community consists of the villages Perivolia and Vrysoules.

== Population ==
Historical population
Year	Pop.	±%
2001	110	—
2011	79	−28.2%
2021	77	−2.5%

== See also ==
- List of settlements in Arcadia
