= Thoknia =

Thoknia Θωκνία
- Community
- Location within Greece
- Coordinates: 37°25′N 22°5′E
- Country: Greece
- Administrative region: Peloponnese
- Regional unit: Arcadia
- Municipality: Megalopoli
- Municipal unit: Megalopoli

Population (2021)
  - Community: 22
- Time zone: UTC+2 (EET)
  - Summer (DST): UTC+3 (EEST)

Thoknia (Greek: Θωκνία) is a village in the municipality of Megalopoli, Arcadia, Greece. It is situated near the confluence of the rivers Alfeios and Elissonas, at about 360 m elevation. It was named after the ancient Arcadian city Thocnia, that was located in the area. Thoknia is 2 km east of Kato Karyes, 3 km southeast of Kyparissia, 3 km southwest of Plaka and 5 km northwest of Megalopoli. The village is surrounded by open-pit lignite mines.

== Population ==
Year	Population
1981	124
1991	110
2001	49
2011	36
2021	22

== See also ==
- List of settlements in Arcadia
