= Kamara, Arcadia =

Kamara Καμάρα
- Community
- Location within Greece
- Coordinates: 37°15′N 22°11′E
- Country: Greece
- Administrative region: Peloponnese
- Regional unit: Arcadia
- Municipality: Megalopoli
- Municipal unit: Falaisia

Population (2021)
  - Community: 148
- Time zone: UTC+2 (EET)
  - Summer (DST): UTC+3 (EEST)

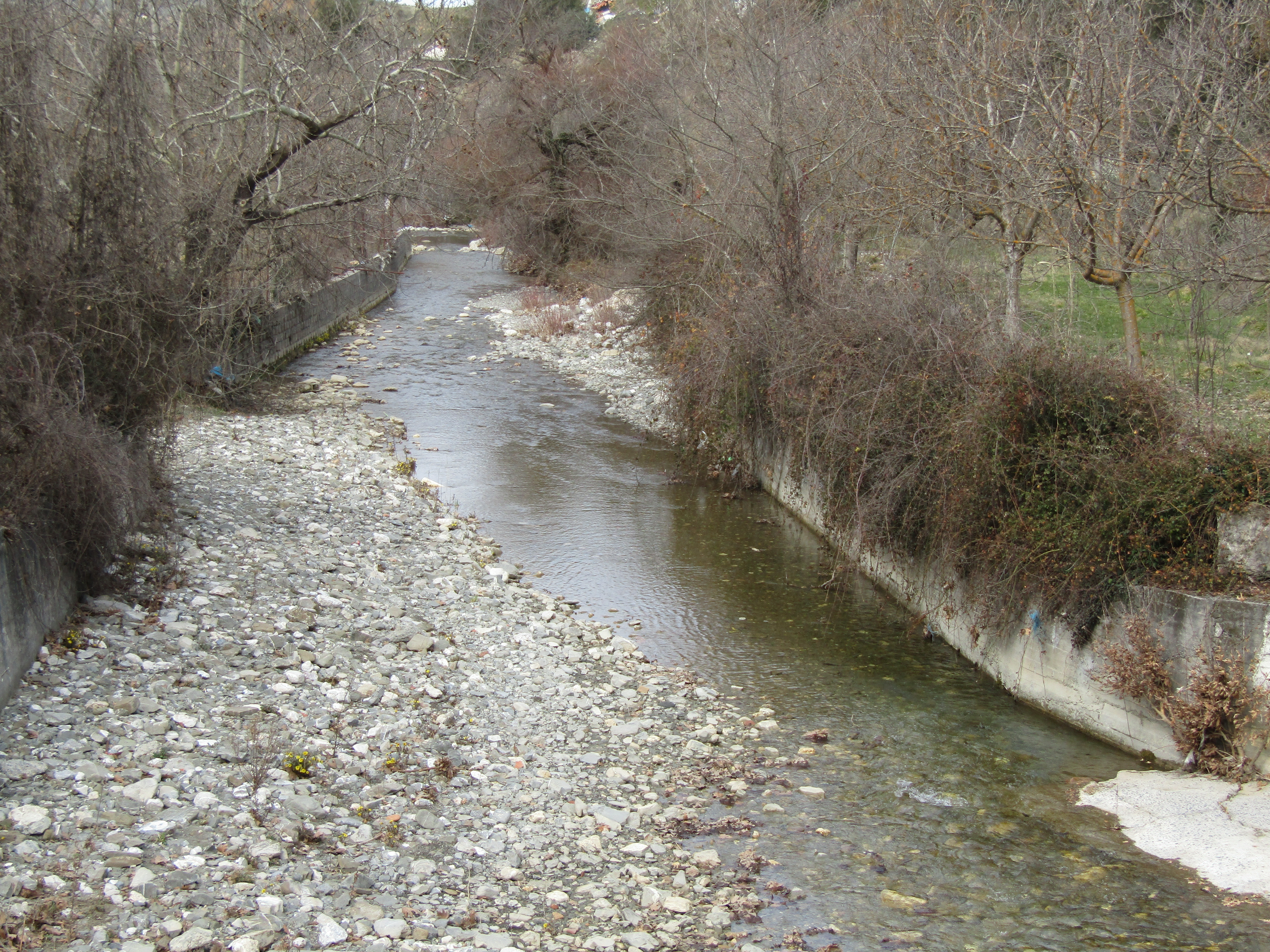

Kamara (Greek: Καμάρα) is a mountain village and a community in the municipal unit of Falaisia, in the southwest of Arcadia, Greece. It is situated on a mountain slope, 5 km east of Tourkolekas, 6 km west of Longanikos, 7 km northwest of Dyrrachio and 18 km south of Megalopoli. The community includes the village Kampochori.

== Population ==
Year	Kamara	Kampochori	Community population
1981	443	-	-
1991	416	80	-
2001	287	68	355
2011	163	47	210
2021	121	27	148

== See also ==
- List of settlements in Arcadia
