= Paradeisia, Arcadia =

Paradeisia Παραδείσια
- Community
- Location within Greece
- Coordinates: 37°19′N 22°5′E
- Country: Greece
- Administrative region: Peloponnese
- Regional unit: Arcadia
- Municipality: Megalopoli
- Municipal unit: Megalopoli

Population (2021)
  - Community: 161
- Time zone: UTC+2 (EET)
  - Summer (DST): UTC+3 (EEST)

Paradeisia (Greek: Παραδείσια, before 1924: Κούρταγα - Kourtaga) is a village and a community in Arcadia, Greece, and a part of the municipality of Megalopoli. The community consists of the villages Paradeisia and Fanaiti. Paradeisia is 4 km east of Chranoi, 4 km west of Veligosti, 4 km north of Chirades and 11 km southwest of Megalopoli.

== Population ==
Year	Village population	Community population
1981	310	-
1991	231	-
2001	303	339
2011	153	175
2021	146	161

== See also ==
- List of settlements in Arcadia
