= Leontari, Arcadia =

Leontari Λεοντάρι
- Community
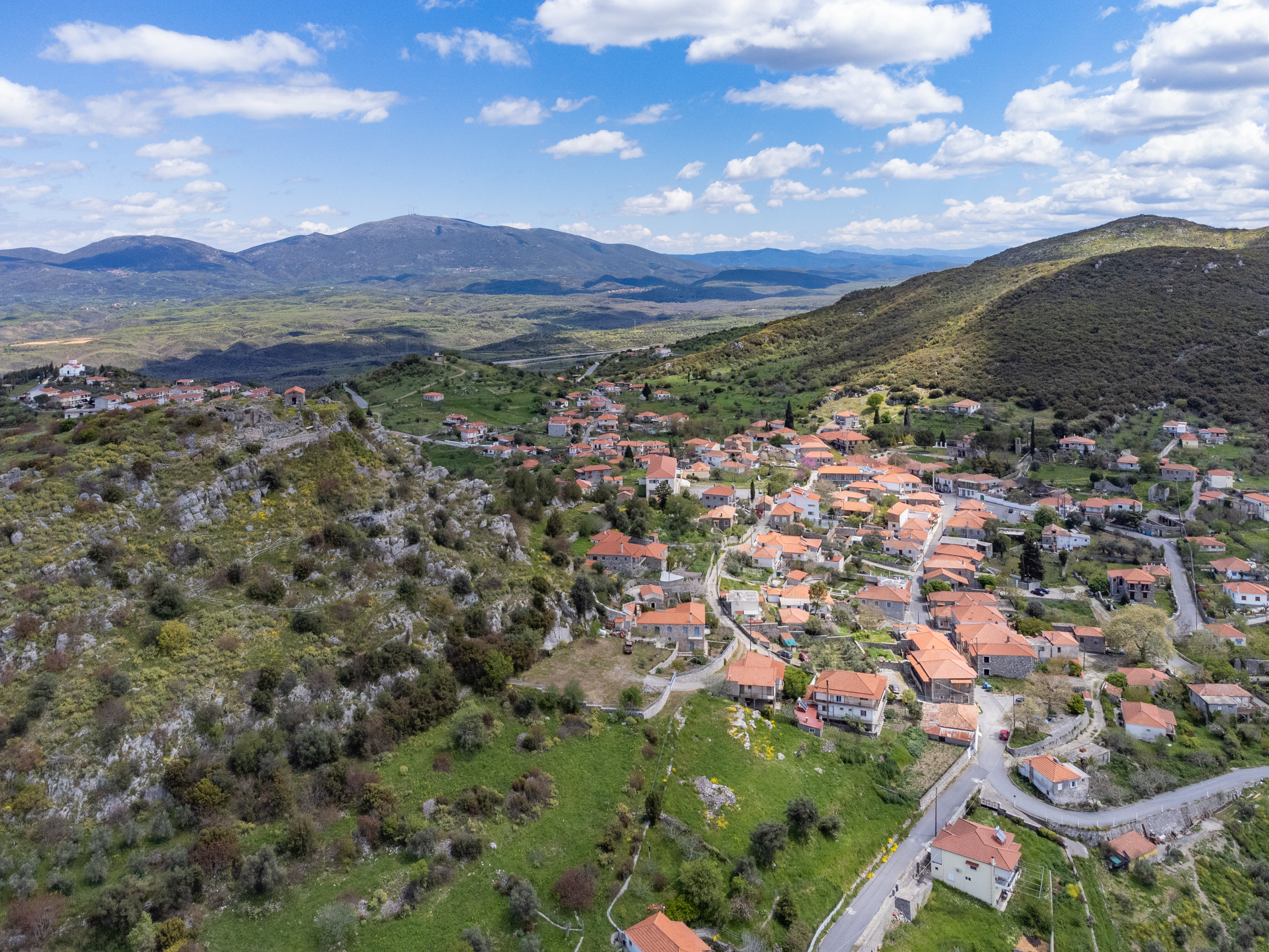
- Aerial view of Leontari

- Location within Greece
- Coordinates: 37°19′N 22°9′E
- Country: Greece
- Administrative region: Peloponnese
- Regional unit: Arcadia
- Municipality: Megalopoli
- Municipal unit: Falaisia

Population (2021)
  - Community: 227
- Time zone: UTC+2 (EET)
  - Summer (DST): UTC+3 (EEST)
- Postal code: 220 21
- Area code: 27910

Leontari (Greek: Λεοντάρι, meaning Lion in English) is a village and a community in the southwestern part of Arcadia, Greece, seat of the former municipality of Falaisia. It is situated on a hillside, 6 km east of Paradeisia, 9 km northwest of Kamara and 9 km south of Megalopoli. The community consists of the villages Leontari, Gavria, Kalyvia, Kamaritsa and Kotsiridi, with a population of 227 (2021 census). Leontari has several monuments from the Byzantine era, including the richly decorated 14th century Church of the Holy Apostles. The area suffered damage from the 2007 Greek forest fires. It is considered a traditional settlement.

== Notable people ==
- Nikitaras, Greek revolutionary

== See also ==
- List of settlements in Arcadia
- List of traditional settlements of Greece
