= Megalopolis, Greece =

Town in Arcadia, Greece

Megalopoli Μεγαλόπολη
- Municipality
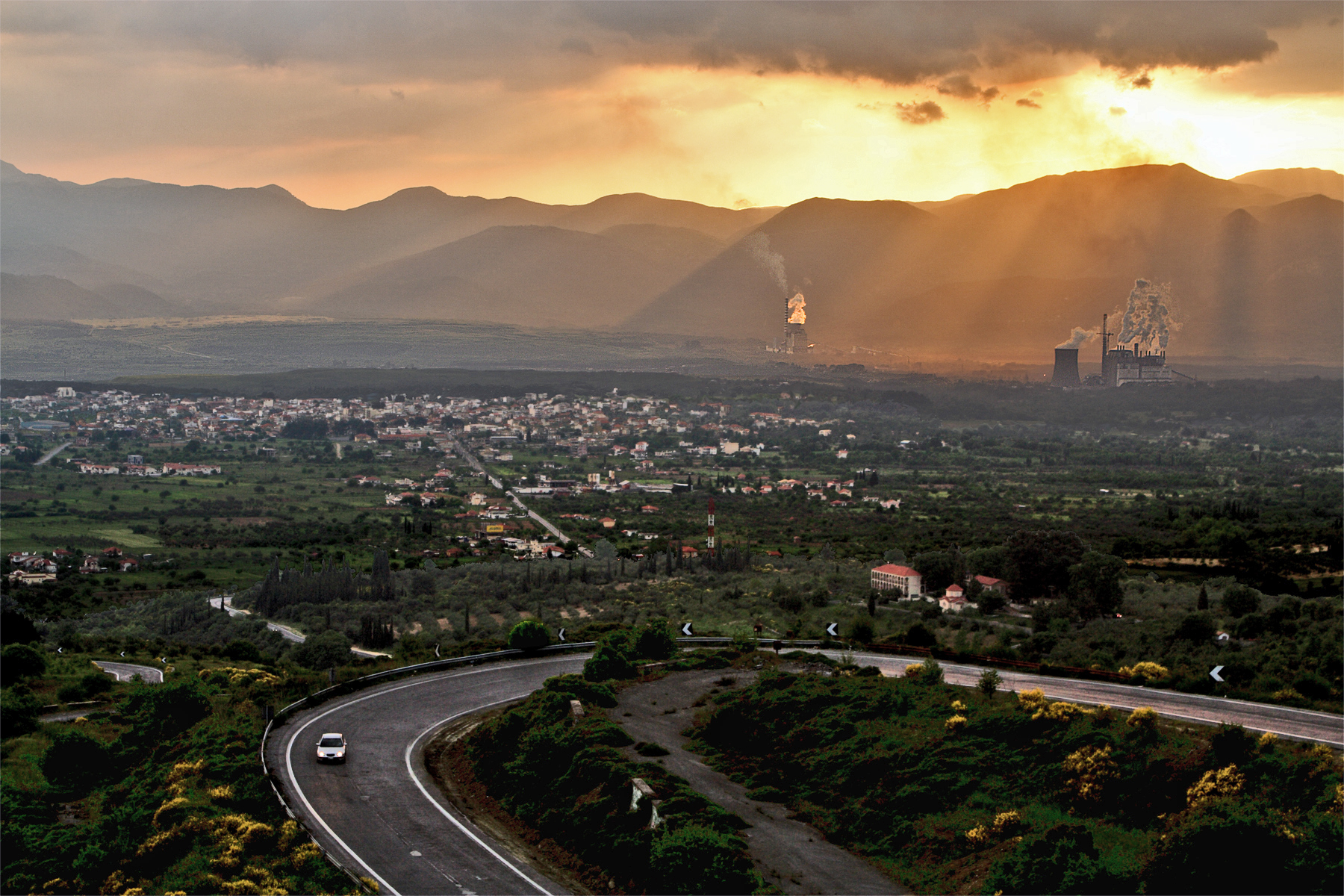

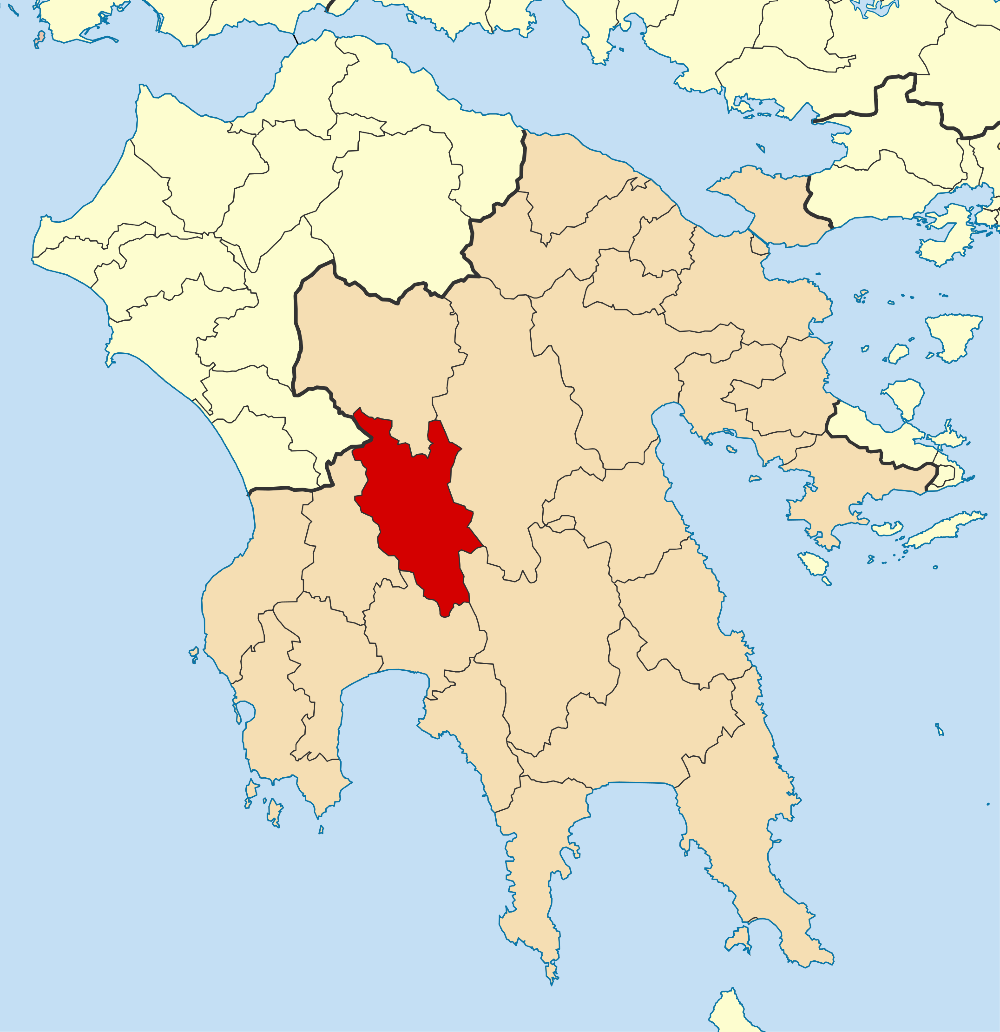

- Location within Greece
- Coordinates: 37°24′N 22°8′E
- Country: Greece
- Administrative region: Peloponnese
- Regional unit: Arcadia
- City established: 371 BC (2397 years ago)

Area
  - Municipality: 722.6 km^{2} (279.0 sq mi)
  - Municipal unit: 331.5 km^{2} (128.0 sq mi)
- Elevation: 430 m (1,410 ft)

Population (2021)
  - Municipality: 8,784
  - Density: 12.16/km^{2} (31.48/sq mi)
  - Municipal unit: 6,905
  - Municipal unit density: 20.83/km^{2} (53.95/sq mi)
  - Community: 5,344
- Time zone: UTC+2 (EET)
  - Summer (DST): UTC+3 (EEST)
- Postal code: 222 00
- Area code: 27910
- Vehicle registration: TP

Megalopoli (Greek: Μεγαλόπολη, Megalopoli) is a town in the southwestern part of the regional unit of Arcadia, southern Greece. It is located on the same site as ancient Megalopolis (Ancient Greek: Μεγαλόπολις, romanized: Megalópolis, lit. 'large/great city'). When it was founded in 371 BC, it was the first large urbanization in rustic Arcadia. Its theatre had a capacity of 20,000 visitors, making it one of the largest ancient Greek theatres.

Today, Megalopoli has several schools, shops, churches, hotels and other services. The population of Megalopoli in 2021 was 5,344 residents.

== Geography ==
Megalopoli municipal unit

Megalopoli is situated in a wide valley, surrounded by mountains: the Taygetus to the south, the Mainalo to the north, the Tsemperou to the southeast and the Lykaion to the west. Its elevation is 430 m above sea level. The river Alfeios flows through this valley, coming from the east and flowing to the north, passing south and west of the town. Its tributary Elissonas passes north of the town.

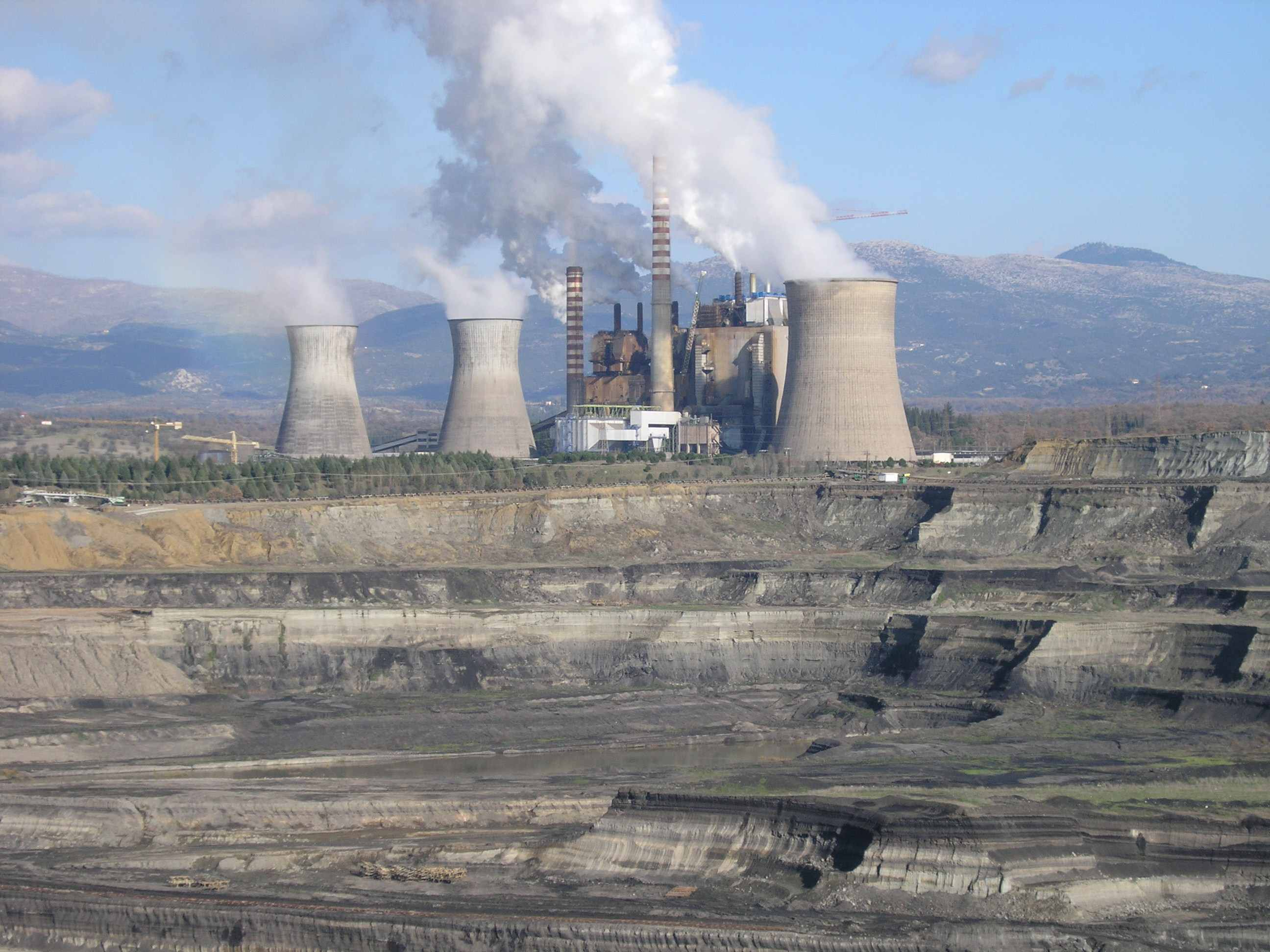
Lignite mining near Megalopoli

The area of Megalopolis features lignite deposits, which are prone to catching fire in summer and can smoulder and scorch the earth for weeks. These deposits are being exploited by open-pit mining and the Megalopoli Power Plant, 3 km northwest of the town centre, has produced electricity from this lignite since 1969.

== History ==
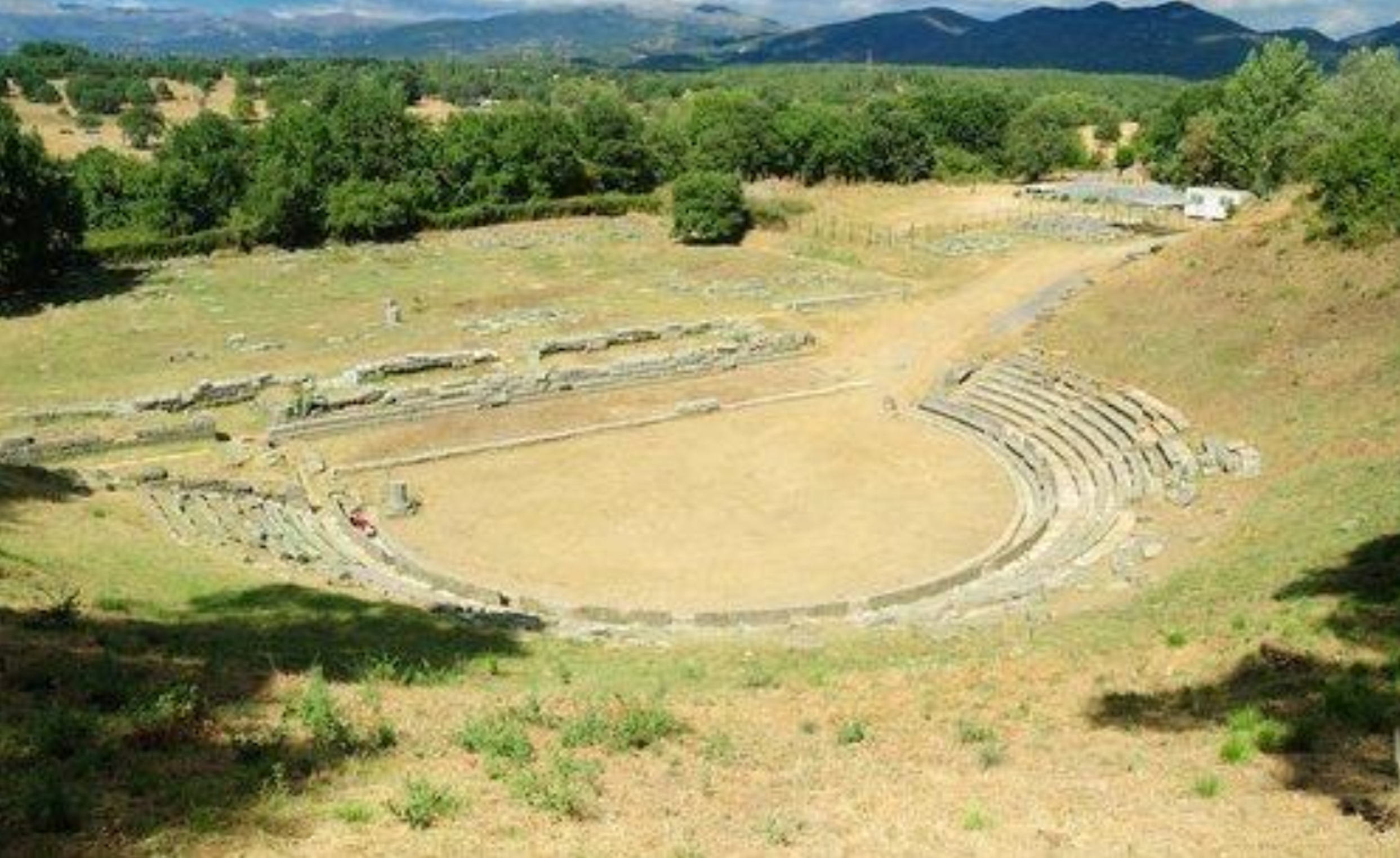
Remains of the theatre

In antiquity, it was often identified as the site of the mythical Gigantomachy where the Greek giants were defeated and killed in a decisive battle with the gods, possibly inspired by enormous bones dug up from around the area taken as giants' bones, as mentioned by Ancient Greek writers such as Pausanias. These have been conjectured in modern times to be those of Pleistocene fossil animals which are still often unearthed from the area today, such as those of the extinct straight-tusked elephant. These animal bones and lignite deposits come from sediments which were deposited around 900–150,000 years ago, when the Megalopolis area contained a large shallow lake.

Evidence has been found from these deposits for the inhabiting of the area by the extinct human species Homo heidelbergensis around 500–400,000 years ago, with evidence for the butchery of straight-tusked elephants and the extinct large hippopotamus Hippopotamus antiquus by these hominins. Wooden tools from the Megalopolis basin dating to approximately 430,000 years ago are as of 2026 the oldest evidence of handheld wooden tools in the world.

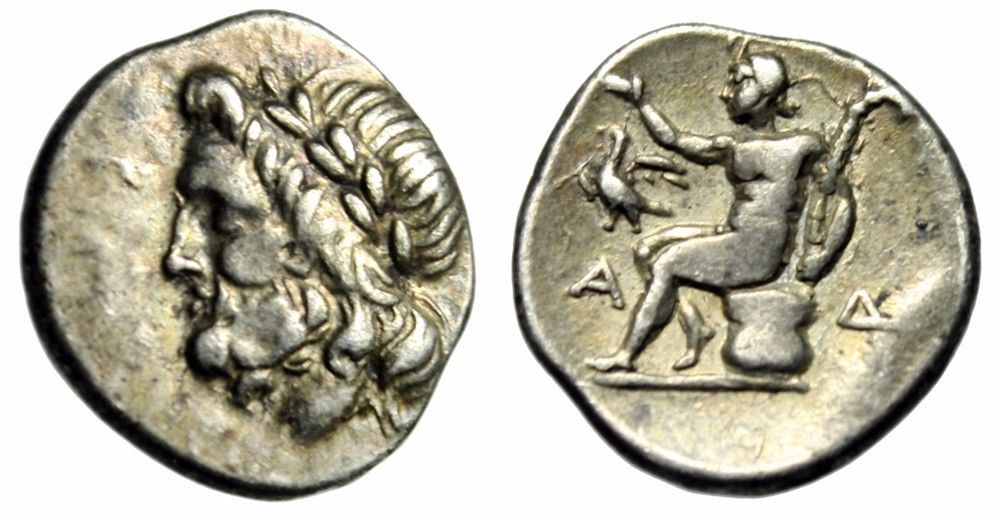
A silver triobol of the Arcadian League from ancient Megalopolis. The head of Zeus on the obverse, Pan seated on the reverse.

The city was founded through a synodical of twenty to forty neighbouring communities between 371 and 368 BC by the Theban general Epaminondas and the Arcadian League in an attempt to form a political counterweight to Sparta. Megalopolis was a member of the Arcadian League after its foundation until the dissolution of the federation in 362 BC. In 353 BC, when Thebes had her hands full with the so-called Third Sacred War, the Spartans made an attempt to reduce Megalopolis; but the Thebans sent assistance and the city was rescued. In 331 BC, Megalopolis was invaded by the Spartans and there was a battle with the Macedonians that came to Megalopolis' help. In 317 BC at the start of the Second War of the Diadochi, Polyperchon, the new Regent of the Macedonian Empire, besieged Megalopolis which had sided with his enemy Cassander. The siege failed.

In the 270s BC, Aristodemus the Good managed to take control over the city as a tyrant backed by Macedon. In 235 BC, the second tyrant of the city, Lydiadas of Megalopolis, gave up control over the polis and the city became a member of the Achaean League. In 222 BC, the Spartan king Cleomenes III burnt down the city, but it was rebuilt in the years after the destruction. As a member of the Achaean League, Megalopolis had a profound influence on the federal politics and it was the hometown of several notable Achaean figures such as Philopoemen, Lykortas and Polybius.

Rome conquered Megalopolis during the Third Macedonian War in 146 BC, as part of their conquest of Greece. The city remained populated under the Romans but by the 6th century it was almost completely abandoned. During the Byzantine era, and later also the Ottoman, the town on the same place was called Sináno (Σινάνο). It was renamed Megalopoli after the Greek War of Independence.

Megalopoli retained a rural character until the early 1960s, when with the help of Megalopoli-born Prof. Leonidas Zervas (then Minister of Industry) the Greek Public Power Corporation started mining lignite in the Megalopoli Mine and the construction of the Megalopoli Power Plant followed soon. The Megalopoli Mine is one of the largest lignite mines in Greece. The town was struck by the massive Arcadia earthquake of 5 April 1965, in which 17 inhabitants died and 80% of residences were demolished or rendered uninhabitable.

== Archeological site ==
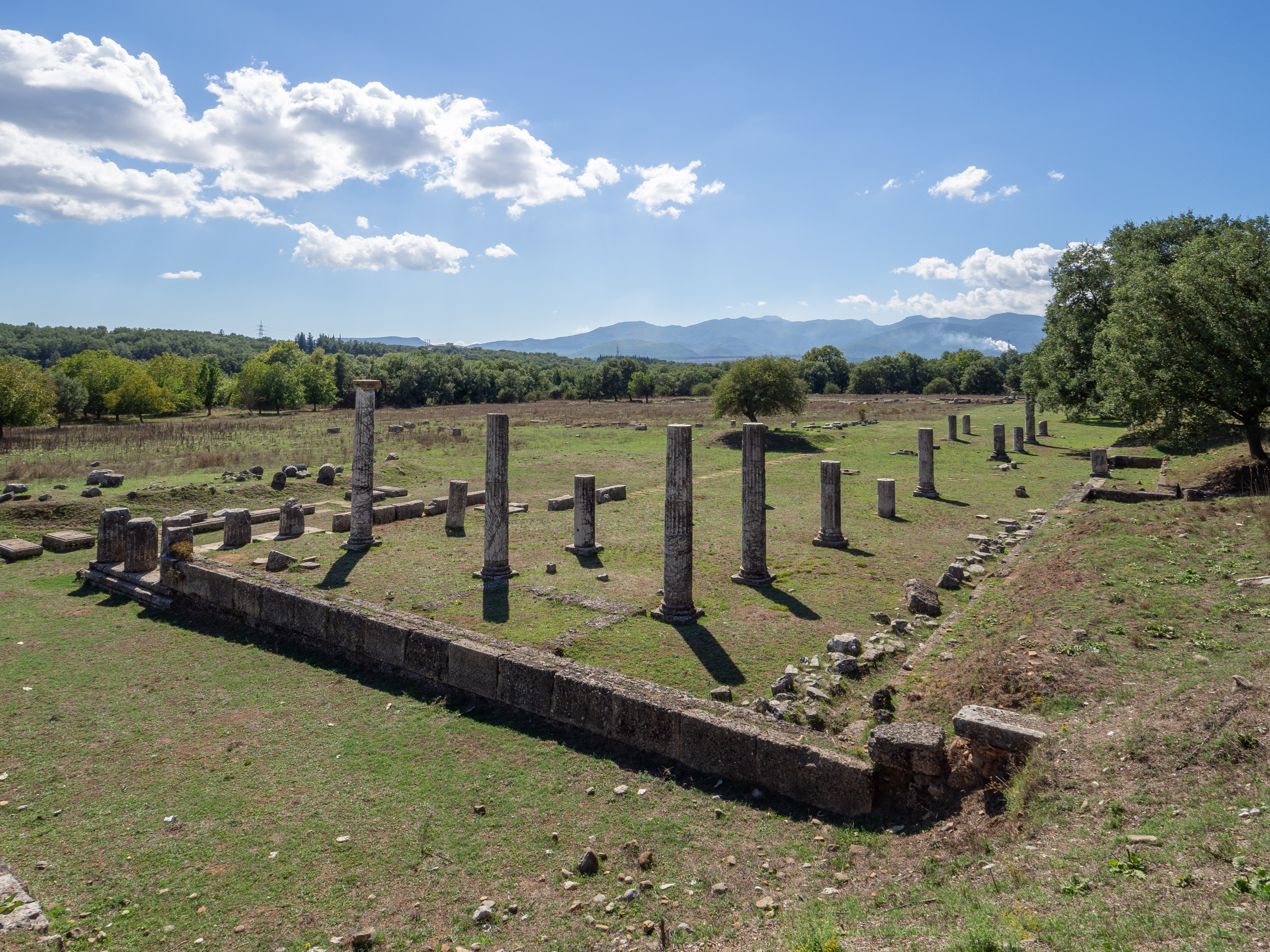
Philippeios stoa

Megalopolis is known for its ancient ruins situated northwest of the town centre, on both banks of the river Elisson. The ruins include an ancient theatre that Pausanias mentions as the largest theatre of Greece and that was 30 m (98 ft) in diameter. The theatre is architecturally connected with the "Thersileon", a building with 67 pillars that might have served cultural as well as political purposes. On an artificial terrace lies a sanctuary – probably the sanctuary of Zeus Soter described by Pausanias – that consists of a peristyle with two propyla and a Doric-Ionic temple (size of the stylobate: 11.62 m × 4.4 m or 38.1 ft × 14.4 ft).

The agora of the city was confined by stoas on two sides: the Stoa Philippeios in the north measured 156 m or 512 ft in length, making it one of the largest stoai of Greece, and was built by the Megalopolitans to honour Philip II of Macedon. In the east stood the Stoa Myropolis with a reconstructed length of around 125 m or 410 ft. The west side of the agora contained a building complex with Bouleuterion and Prytaneion, built over the ruins of the former city palace, as well as a sanctuary for Zeus and Hestia. In the northwestern edge of the Agora some scarce remains of a large building might be interpreted as place for the ecclesia. In the northeastern edge of the Agora stood the so-called Archeia, a hall with statues.

== Municipality ==
The municipality Megalopoli was formed at the 2011 local government reform by the merger of the following three former municipalities, that became municipal units:

- Falaisia
- Gortyna
- Megalopoli

The municipality has an area of 722.629 km^{2}, the municipal unit 331.498 km^{2}.

=== Subdivisions ===
The municipal unit of Megalopoli is subdivided into the following communities (villages within the community in brackets):

- Anthochori
- Ano Karyes
- Chirades
- Choremis (Choremis, Apiditsa)
- Chranoi
- Gefyra
- Isaris (Isaris, Petrovouni, Chrousa)
- Isoma Karyon
- Karatoulas
- Kastanochori
- Kato Karyes
- Lykaio
- Lykochia
- Lykosoura
- Makrysi (Makrysi, Kato Makrysi)
- Mallota
- Marathoussa
- Megalopoli (Megalopoli, Oresteio)
- Nea Ekklisoula
- Neochori Lykosouras
- Paradeisia (Paradeisia, Fanaiti)
- Perivolia (Perivolia, Vrysoules)
- Plaka
- Rapsommati
- Souli (Souli, Derveni)
- Soulos
- Thoknia
- Trilofo (Trilofo, Palaiomoiri)
- Tripotamo
- Vangos
- Vastas

== Province ==
The province of Megalopoli (Greek: Επαρχία Μεγαλόπολης) was one of the provinces of the Messenia Prefecture. Its territory corresponded with that of the current municipality Megalopoli, except the municipal unit Gortyna. It was abolished in 2006.

== Population ==
Year	Community	Municipal unit	Municipality
1920	1,776	–	–
1961	2,235	–	–
1981	4,875	–	–
1991	4,646	8,888	–
2001	5,114	8,657	–
2011	5,779	7,890	10,687
2021	5,344	6,905	8,784

== Notable people ==
- Chaeron of Megalopolis (4th century BC), envoy of Philip II of Macedon
- Cercidas (3rd century BC), Cynic philosopher and poet
- Philopoemen (253–183 BC), general and statesman
- Polybius (c. 203–120 BC), historian
- Leonidas Zervas (1902–1980), Greek chemist

== See also ==
- List of settlements in Arcadia

== Bibliography ==
- Gardner, Ernest Arthur; Loring, William; Richards, G. C.; Woodhouse, William John (1892). Excavations at Megalopolis 1890-1891. London: Macmillan.
- Lauter-Bufe, Heide (2009). Das Heiligtum des Zeus Soter in Megalopolis [The Sanctuary of Zeus Soter at Megalopolis]. Mainz: Zabern. ISBN 978-3-8053-3963-6.
- Lauter-Bufe, Heide; Lauter, Hans (2011). Die politischen Bauten von Megalopolis [The political buildings of Megalopolis]. Darmstadt/Mainz: Zabern. ISBN 978-3-8053-4324-4.
- Lauter-Bufe, Heide (2014). Die Stoa Philippeios in Megalopolis [The Stoa Philippeios at Megalopolis]. Mainz: Nünnerich-Asmus. ISBN 978-3-943904-78-9.
- Lauter-Bufe, Heide (2017). Megalopolis. Theater and Thersilion [Megalopolis. The theatre and the Thersileon]. Mainz: Nünnerich-Asmus. ISBN 978-3-961760-07-7.
- Lauter-Bufe, Heide (2020). Megalopolis - eine griechische Stadt in Arkadien. Die Stoa Myropolis [Megalopolis - a Greek City in Arcadia. The Stoa Myropolis]. Oppenheim: Nünnerich-Asmus. ISBN 978-3-96176-102-9.
