= Bathos (Arcadia) =

Coordinates: 37°27′04″N 22°03′36″E

Bathos (Ancient Greek: Βάθος) was a town of ancient Arcadia in the district Parrhasia, between Trapezus and Basilis. Near to a neighbouring fountain called Olympias, fire was seen to issue from the ground.

Its site is located between the modern Mavria and Kyparissia.
