= Rhaeteae =

Rhaeteae or Rhaiteai (Ancient Greek: Ῥαιτέαι) was a locality in ancient Arcadia, in the district of Cynuria. It was located at the confluence of the Gortynius and Alpheius. Its site is unlocated.
