= Kyparissia, Arcadia =

Kyparissia Κυπαρίσσια
- Community
- Location within Greece
- Coordinates: 37°26.7′N 22°04′E
- Country: Greece
- Administrative region: Peloponnese
- Regional unit: Arcadia
- Municipality: Megalopoli
- Municipal unit: Gortyna

Population (2021)
  - Community: 15
- Time zone: UTC+2 (EET)
  - Summer (DST): UTC+3 (EEST)

Kyparissia (Greek: Κυπαρισσία) is a village in southwestern Arcadia, in the Peloponnese peninsula of continental Greece.

It is part of the municipal unit of Gortyna. It is situated near the left bank of the river Alfeios. 1 km south of Mavria, 3 km east of Kourounios, 3 km northeast of Isoma Karyon, 3 km west of Katsimpalis, 5 km southeast of Karytaina and 8 km northwest of Megalopoli. There are lignite mines east of the village.

== History and remains ==
The town lay in Achaea (Roman province) and after split in the Late Roman province of Peloponnesus Secundus.

The ancient city Trapezus was situated near the village.

To the east of the modern village lay the ancient town of Basilis (Βασιλίς), which had largely vanished by the 2nd century AD, when the geographer Pausanias recorded that only the sanctuary of hunting goddess Artemis survived. The site is now being excavated.

== Population ==
Year	Population
1981	107
1991	111
2001	95
2011	58
2021	15

== Notable locals ==
- Michalis Katsaros (1923-1998), poet

== See also ==
- List of settlements in Arcadia

== Sources and external links ==
- History and Information about Kyparissia
- GCatholic - Ciparissia, with (titular) incumbent bios
- Raymond Janin, lemma 'Cyparissia', in Dictionnaire d'Histoire et de Géographie ecclésiastiques, vol. XIII, Paris 1956, coll. 1147-1148
