= Buphagium =

Coordinates: 37°32′57″N 21°59′51″E

Buphagium or Bouphagion (Ancient Greek: Βουφάγιον) was an ancient town in the Greek region of Arcadia, in the district Cynuria, situated near the sources of the river Buphagus (Βουφάγος), a tributary of the Alpheius, which formed the boundary between the territories of Heraea and Megalopolis.

Its site is located near the modern Kryo Nero. Buphagium lies to the north of the Alpheios river valley. As the terrain slopes steeply down to the river, access to the city is only possible from the north. In the centre of the walled city area is the acropolis with a separate fortress wall. The capitals and other architectural elements used in the chapel there indicate that the Acropolis contained an opulent building in ancient times.
