= Kotyli (disambiguation) =

Kotyli or Kotili (Greek: Κοτύλη or Κωτίλι) may refer to several places in Greece:

- Kotyli, a community in the Xanthi regional unit
- Kotili, Arcadia, a village in Arcadia
- Kotyli, Kastoria, a village in the Kastoria regional unit
- Kotili, Kilkis, a settlement in the Kilkis regional unit

Kotili may also refer to:

- Kotili, Democratic Republic of the Congo, a village in Bas-Uele Province
