= Brenthe =

Coordinates: 37°29′01″N 22°02′34″E

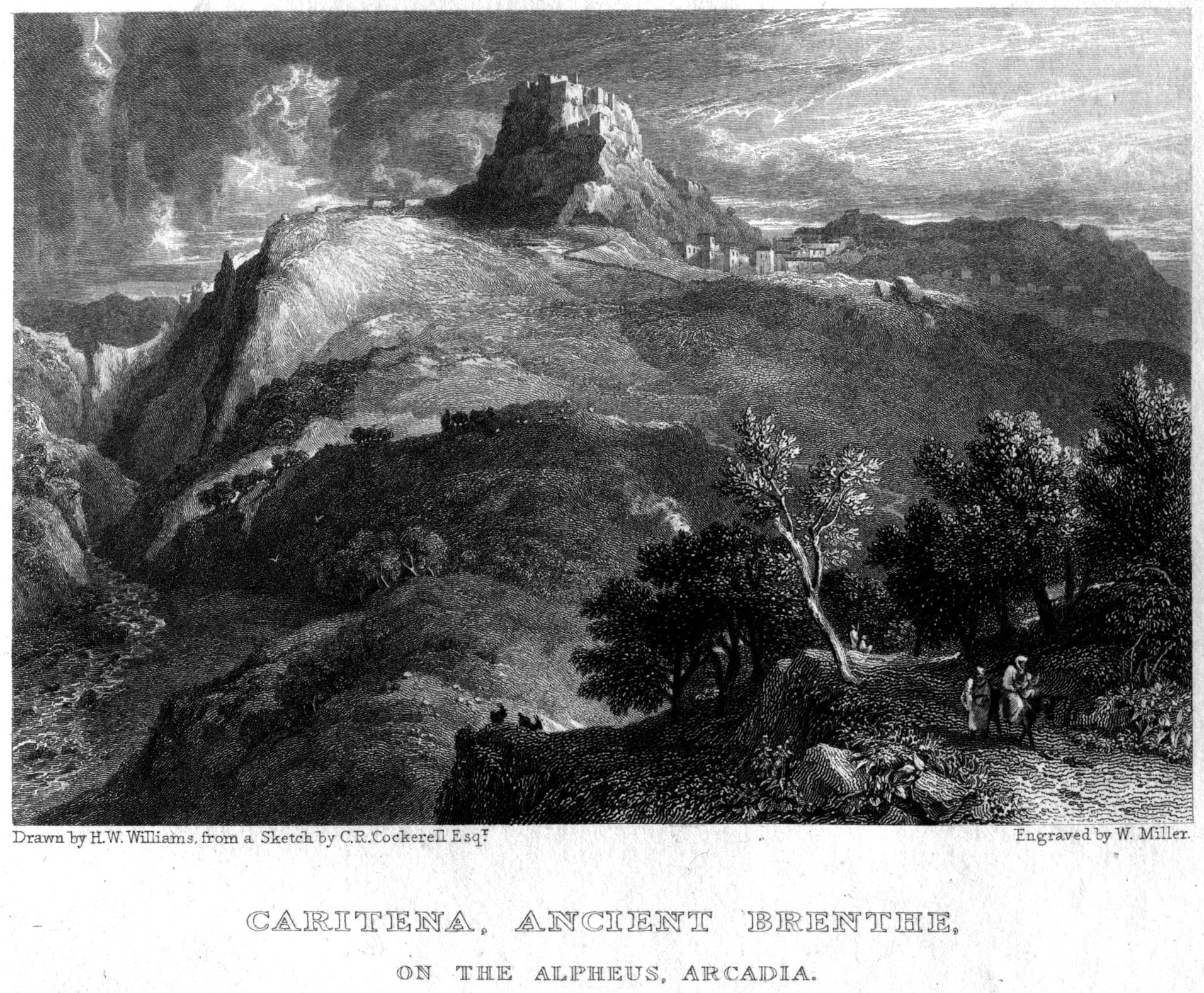
Caritena, Ancient Brenthe engraving by William Miller after H W Williams

Brenthe (Ancient Greek: Βρένθη) was an ancient town in the Greek region of Arcadia, located in the district Cynuria.

The ancient author Pausanias describes it as laying between Gortys and Megalopolis, north of the river Alpheius. Near the town, Pausanias mentions a small river of only five stadia in length called Brentheates (Βρενθεάτης) which flows into the Alpheius.

Brenthe is traditionally located near the modern Karytaina although not all details of this place fit the description by Pausanias. For example, no river exists today that could be identified with the Brentheates. Furthermore, no clearly identifiable remains of ancient buildings have been found there. However, no better localisation of Brenthe could be found yet.
