= Maratha (Arcadia) =

Maratha (Ancient Greek: Μάραθα) was an ancient village in the Greek region of Arcadia on the Peloponnese, situated in the district Cynuria.

The ancient author Pausanias mentions it as a "place" (χωρίον) situated between the sources of the Buphagus and the city Gortys. It has been identified with the modern village of Vlachorraptis, which has been disputed, but is now widely accepted.

Northeast of Vlachorraptis lies a small fortification on the peak of a mountain near the church of Agios Nikolaos. These remains have been dated to the late 4th or early 3rd century BC. The relevance of the place probably resulted from its location near the borders between the spheres of influence of Megalopolis and Heraea.
