= Gortyna, Arcadia =

Gortyna Γόρτυνα
- Municipal unit
- Location within the regional unit

- Location within Greece
- Coordinates: 37°32′22.29″N 22°2′43.5″E
- Country: Greece
- Administrative region: Peloponnese
- Regional unit: Arcadia
- Municipality: Megalopolis

Area
  - Municipal unit: 116.2 km^{2} (44.9 sq mi)
- Elevation: 482 m (1,581 ft)

Population (2021)
  - Municipal unit: 424
  - Municipal unit density: 3.65/km^{2} (9.45/sq mi)
- Time zone: UTC+2 (EET)
  - Summer (DST): UTC+3 (EEST)
- Postal code: 220 22
- Area code: 27910
- Vehicle registration: TP
- Website: www.gortynos.gr

Gortyna (Greek: Γόρτυνα), is a former municipality in Arcadia, Peloponnese, Greece. Since the 2011 local government reform it is part of the municipality Megalopoli, of which it is a municipal unit. The municipal unit has an area of 116.205 km^{2}. Its seat was in the village Karytaina. The name of the municipality was taken from the ancient city of Gortys.

== Subdivisions ==
The municipal unit Gortyna is subdivided into the following communities (constituent villages in brackets):

- Atsicholos
- Karytaina (Karytaina, Kalyvakia, Karvounari)
- Katsimpalis
- Kotili (Kotili, Palatos, Strongylo)
- Kourounios
- Kyparissia
- Mavria
- Sarakini (Sarakini, Kryonero, Palaiokastro)
- Vlachorraptis
- Zoni

== Population ==
| Year | Population |
|---|---|
| 2001 | 777 |
| 2011 | 720 |
| 2021 | 424 |

== Ancient Gortys ==
The ancient city Gortys was located in the valley of the river Lousios. It reputedly was founded by Gortys, son of Stymphalus, a legendary king of Arcadia. When Megalopolis was founded in the 4th century BC, many inhabitants moved to the new city, but Gortys was still inhabited in the 2nd century AD, a village belonging to Megalopolis then. Ancient Gortys was known for its Temple of Asclepius. The ruins of Gortys have been excavated between 1940 and 1956. They are located near the road from Atsicholos to Elliniko. The remains of several fortifications, temples and baths have been found.

== Geography ==
The territory of the municipal unit Gortyna is very mountainous: the Mainalo lies to the northeast, and the Lykaion to the southwest. The rivers Lousios and Alfeios flow through it and have created deep gorges. The plain of Megalopoli lies to the southeast. Gortyna borders on Elis to the west, and Messenia to the southwest. Gortyna is about 12 km northwest of Megalopoli, 12 km south of Dimitsana, 30 km west of Tripoli, 50 km north of Kalamata and 60 km southeast of Pyrgos.

== See also ==
- List of settlements in Arcadia
