= Zoni, Arcadia =

Zoni Ζώνη
- Community
- Location within Greece
- Coordinates: 37°28′N 22°07′E
- Country: Greece
- Administrative region: Peloponnese
- Regional unit: Arcadia
- Municipality: Megalopoli
- Municipal unit: Gortyna

Population (2021)
  - Community: 37
- Time zone: UTC+2 (EET)
  - Summer (DST): UTC+3 (EEST)

Zoni (Greek: Ζώνη, before 1928: Ζουνάτι - Zounati) is a village in Arcadia, Greece. It is part of the municipal unit of Gortyna. It is situated in the southwestern foothills of the Mainalo mountains, at about 500 m elevation. It is 2 km northeast of Katsimpalis, 7 km southeast of Karytaina and 7 km north of Megalopoli.

The village is first mentioned in 1810. It was the seat of the Verenthi Municipality (Δήμος Βερένθης), named after the ancient town Brenthe, between 1835 and 1841.

== Historical population ==
Year	Population
1920	372
1961	192
1981	137
1991	181
2001	118
2011	74
2021	37

== See also ==
- List of settlements in Arcadia
