= Sarakini =

Village in the Peloponnese, Greece

Sarakini Σαρακίνι
- Community
- Location within Greece
- Coordinates: 37°32′N 22°00′E
- Country: Greece
- Administrative region: Peloponnese
- Regional unit: Arcadia
- Municipality: Megalopoli
- Municipal unit: Gortyna

Population (2021)
  - Community: 30
- Time zone: UTC+2 (EET)
  - Summer (DST): UTC+3 (EEST)

Sarakini (Greek: Σαρακίνι) is a village and a community in the municipal unit of Gortyna, western Arcadia, Greece. It is situated on a hill above the right bank of the river Alfeios, at about 450 m elevation. It is 2 km northwest of Vlachorraptis, 4 km northeast of Theisoa (Elis), 7 km northwest of Karytaina and 8 km southwest of Dimitsana. The community includes the villages Kryonero and Palaiokastro.

== History ==
The village of Sarakini is first recorded in 1665, and was built, according to tradition, by settlers from Constantinople. Palaiokastro is the site of a Mycenaean-era settlement (Homer's Phere), with a cemetery and a nekromanteion having been found. The ruins of a nearby medieval fortress have been identified with the Araklovon Castle. The village of Kryoneri is first mentioned in the Ottoman tax registers of 1698/1700, although its present site is more recent, as the village was moved from its original location.

== Population ==
Year	Population	Community population
1981	-	156
1991	56	-
2001	37	114
2011	8	51
2021	5	30

== See also ==
- List of settlements in Arcadia
