= Katsimpalis =

Katsimpalis Κατσίμπαλης
- Community
- Location within Greece
- Coordinates: 37°27′N 22°06′E
- Country: Greece
- Administrative region: Peloponnese
- Regional unit: Arcadia
- Municipality: Megalopoli
- Municipal unit: Gortyna

Population (2021)
  - Community: 21
- Time zone: UTC+2 (EET)
  - Summer (DST): UTC+3 (EEST)

Katsimpalis (Greek: Κατσίμπαλης) is a village in the municipal unit of Gortyna, southwest Arcadia, Greece. It is situated on a hillside above the right bank of the river Alfeios. It is 2 km southwest of Zoni, 3 km east of Kyparissia, 6 km southeast of Karytaina and 7 km northwest of Megalopoli. There is a large lignite mine to the south. The Greek National Road 76 (Krestena - Andritsaina - Megalopoli) passes through the village.

== Population ==
Year	Population
1981	80
1991	84
2001	61
2011	32
2021	21

== See also ==
- List of settlements in Arcadia
