= Basilis =

Coordinates: 37°26′42″N 22°04′05″E

The term is also a female form of Basileus

Basilis (Ancient Greek: Βάσιλις or Βασιλίς) was a town of ancient Arcadia in the district Parrhasia. It was situated on the river Alpheus. According to Greek mythology, it was said to have been founded by the Arcadian king Cypselus. Its location has been identified with a site east of the modern village Kyparissia, north of Megalopoli. It lay between the towns Trapezus and Thocnia. There was a sanctuary of the Eleusinian Demeter. The village was already in ruins when Pausanias visited the area in the 2nd century.

Basilis is also a popular name among orthodox Christians (Greek: Βασίλης).
