= Gleichenberg Kögel =

Extinct volcanoes in Styria, Austria

- Gleichenberge; Gleichenberge Kogeln
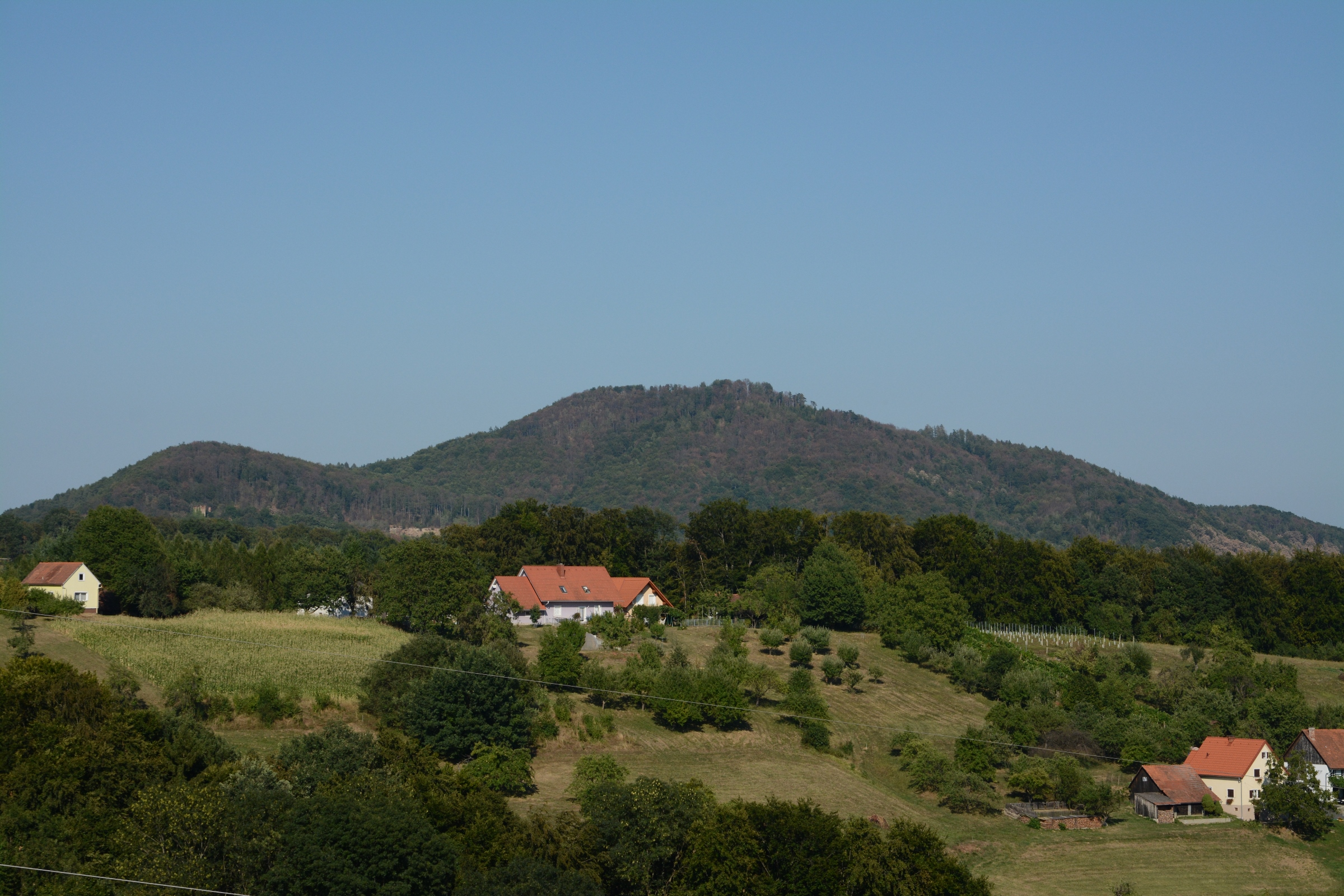
- View of the two volcanoes

Highest point
- Elevation: 1,961 ft (598 m)
- Coordinates: 46°53′31″N 15°54′30″E

Geography
- Location within Austria
- Location: Styria

Geology
- Rock age: 17 MYA
- Mountain type: Extinct volcanoes
- Rock type: Basalt
- Volcanic zone: Alpine–Himalayan orogenic belt
- Last eruption: 2 MYA

Gleichenberger Kögel or Gleichenberge are two extinct volcanos in southern Styria, Austria. The Volcano is made up of two peaks, Gleichenberger Kogel (598 metres [1,962 ft]) and its secondary peak the Bschaidkogel (563 metres [1,847 ft]), at the same time it gives its name to the homonymous village of Bad Gleichenberg.

== Volcanism ==
Volcanism began in the Miocene around 17 ma (here the local Carpathian epoch), when the African Plate pushed under the Eurasian Plate, and lasted for five million years, This violent tectonics melted the rocks. Magma rise tore African rock to the surface and thus formed the Gleichenberg volcanoes, They stood in a subtropical sea for a few million years the lower parts of the volcanic cones were buried by deposits over time so that today only their tips rise up from the underground as double peaks, It belongs to the Styrian Vulkanland, a tourist name for the south-east of the East Styrian Volcanic Land, This sedimentary area of the Graz Bay of the Paratethys Sea, from which some volcanic island mountains protrude, was formed at about the same time as the volcanic formation, During this period the Badenian, the mountains may have protruded from the shallow sea as volcanic islands, at least during the sea's retreat stages.

== Tourism ==
The Association for the Promotion of the Styrian Volcanic Region opens up the region's volcanic chains for teaching and hiking to natural history-geological associations and tourists.
