= Dulia =

Dulia may refer to:

- Dulia (Latin), Latin term for veneration
- Douleia (Greek: δουλεία), Greek term for slavery
- Dulia, Democratic Republic of the Congo, a village
