= Steirisches Vulkanland =

Extinct volcanic field in Styria, Austria

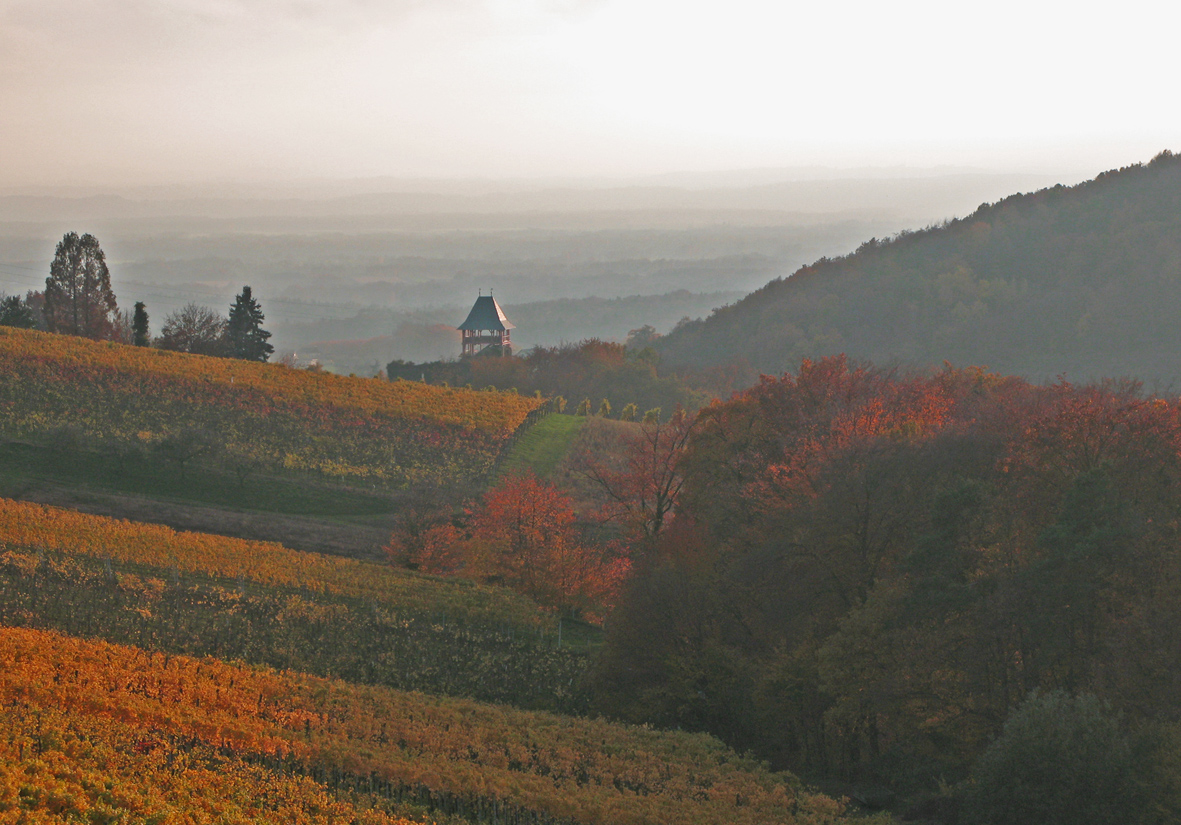

Highest point
- Coordinates: 46°54′N 15°50′E

Geography
- Location within Austria
- Location: Styria, Austria

Geology
- Rock age: 18–15 MYA
- Mountain type(s): Extinct Volcanoes, Maars, Diatremes
- Volcanic zone: Alpine–Himalayan orogenic belt
- Last eruption: 2 MYA (in the Gleichenberge Volcano)

Steirisches Vulkanland (English: Styrian Volcanic Land) is an extinct volcanic field located in the Austrian state of Styria which maintained activity between 15 ma–2 ma ago, its last activity being in the Gleichenberg Kögel in Burgenland, currently the remnants of this volcanic field are the Hills, Maars and Diatremes.

== Origin and History ==
The origin of the volcanic activity began during the collision of the African Plate and Eurasian Plate, the formation of the Styrian basin and the simultaneous filling of part of the associated Paratethys sea began about 18 ma, in that period the volcanic activity would begin due to the system of faults and would be at its apogee 15 ma ago, the volcanic peaks protruded from the paratethys sea while the sea was inhabited by different marine species, the sea was shallow, around 13 ma ago and would begin to dry slowly and around 11 ma the land would become more swampy, with small lakes and trees where now quadrupeds and birds would inhabit at the same time the volcanic activity would also be extinguished even though the expulsions of lava and ash would continue, although the activity would continue in volcanoes such as Pauliberg and Gleichenberg Kögel, around 5 ma the region would have already dried up and the uplift phase of the basin and the erosion of the rock mass would begin, the last volcanic phase would begin in the Pleistocene during the ice age, the fauna would dry up and be covered under snow, the activity would decrease considerably and only the volcanoes would release slag and gas-rich explosions including lava flows, there would also be violent explosions due to contact of the water with the volcanic diatreme, after this the stage would end until 2 million years ago with the last eruption of the Gleichenberg Kögel volcano.

== Tourism ==
Steirisches Vulkanland logo

Steirisches Vulkanland is a region visited in Styria for its importance wine and forests, also for the crafts that are made as well as gastronomy, also where cycling and camping are experienced.

== See also ==
- List of volcanic fields
