= Bathos (disambiguation) =

Bathos is a literary term and device.

Bathos may also refer to:

- Bathos (album), by the group Aarni
- Bathos (EP), by the group Aborted
- Bathos (Arcadia), a town of ancient Arcadia, Greece
