= Vlachorraptis =

Vlachorraptis Βλαχορράπτης
- Settlement
- Location within Greece
- Coordinates: 37°32′N 22°01′E
- Country: Greece
- Administrative region: Peloponnese
- Regional unit: Arcadia
- Municipality: Megalopoli
- Municipal unit: Gortyna
- Community: Marathas

Population (2021)
  - Total: 34
- Time zone: UTC+2 (EET)
  - Summer (DST): UTC+3 (EEST)

Vlachorraptis (Greek: Βλαχορράπτης, also Βλαχορράφτης - Vlachorraftis) is a village in western Arcadia, Greece. It is the only village in the community Marathas. It is situated on a hill above the right bank of the river Alfeios, at about 650 m elevation. It is 2 km southeast of Sarakini, 2 km west of Atsicholos, 6 km northwest of Karytaina and 7 km southwest of Stemnitsa. In 2011 Vlachorraptis had a population of 40.

According to the ancient geographer Pausanias the city of Maratha (Μάραθα) was located on the site of the modern village. The modern settlement however was founded in ca. 1600.

== Population ==
Year	Population
1981	101
1991	64
2001	110
2011	40

== Notable people ==
- Theodore Angelopoulos (b. 1943), businessman

== See also ==
- List of settlements in Arcadia
