= Kourounios =

Kourounios Κουρουνιός
- Community
- Location within Greece
- Coordinates: 37°27′N 22°02′E
- Country: Greece
- Administrative region: Peloponnese
- Regional unit: Arcadia
- Municipality: Megalopoli
- Municipal unit: Gortyna

Population (2021)
  - Community: 19
- Time zone: UTC+2 (EET)
  - Summer (DST): UTC+3 (EEST)

Kourounios (Greek: Κουρουνιός) is a mountain village in the municipal unit Gortyna, southwestern Arcadia, Greece. It is situated in the eastern foothills of mount Lykaion, overlooking the Alfeios valley. It is 2 km west of Mavria, 3 km north of Isoma Karyon, 4 km south of Karytaina and 11 km northwest of Megalopoli.

== History ==
The village is first mentioned in 1302, and the remains of the Frankish castle of Saint George in Skorta are located nearby. On 27/28 March 1821, during the first days of the Greek War of Independence, Greeks under Theodoros Kolokotronis ambushed and defeated a Turkish force in the gorge west of the village. Among the historical buildings of the area are the ruins of the village of Xirokarytaina (Ξηροκαρύταινα) and of the so-called "Burned Mosque" (Καμένο Τζαμί), as well as the chapel of Psili Panagia, built in 1870.

== Population ==
Year	Population
1981	111
1991	78
2001	80
2011	33
2021	19

== See also ==
- List of settlements in Arcadia
