= Elliniko, Arcadia =

Elliniko Ελληνικό
- Community
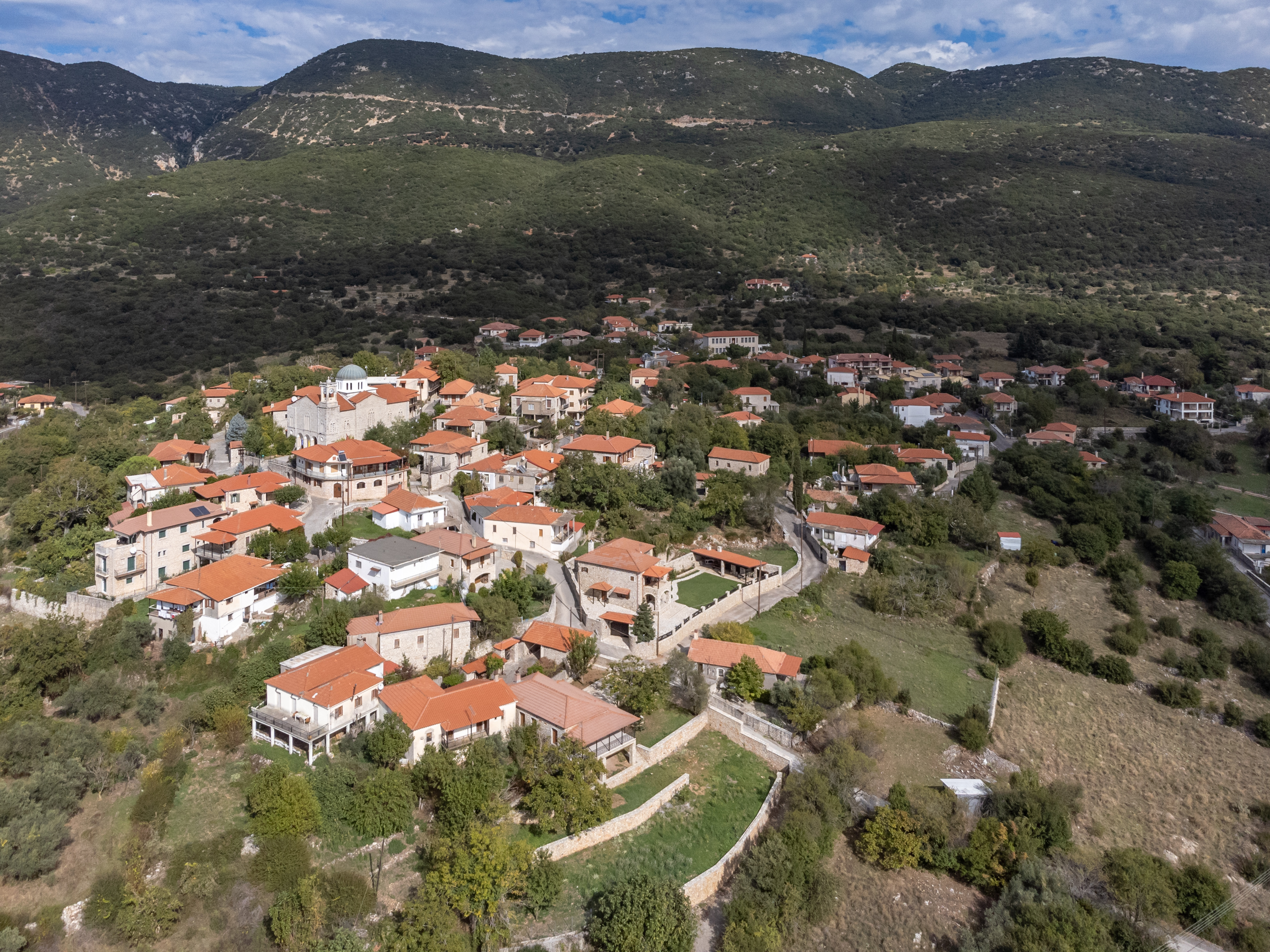
- Aerial view of the village

- Location within Greece
- Coordinates: 37°31′N 22°4′E
- Country: Greece
- Administrative region: Peloponnese
- Regional unit: Arcadia
- Municipality: Gortynia
- Municipal unit: Trikolonoi
- Elevation: 720 m (2,360 ft)

Population (2021)
  - Community: 129
- Time zone: UTC+2 (EET)
  - Summer (DST): UTC+3 (EEST)
- Vehicle registration: TP

Elliniko (Greek: Ελληνικό, before 1927: Μουλάτσι - Moulatsi) is a mountain village in western Arcadia, Greece (the original village name of “Moulatsi” was referenced in Ottoman Empire documents as far back as 1515).

It is part of the municipal unit of Trikolonoi. It is situated on a mountain slope on the left bank of the river Lousios. It is 4 km south of Stemnitsa, 4 km east of Atsicholos, 5 km northeast of Karytaina and 14 km northwest of Megalopoli.

The ruins of the ancient city Gortys are on the right bank of the river Lousios, near the road from Elliniko to Atsicholos.

Greek politician Dimitris Avramopoulos hails from Elliniko as well as prominent “multi generational” companies owned by the Fourlis and Kourouniotis Families.

== Population ==
| Year | Population |
|---|---|
| 1981 | 401 |
| 1991 | 349 |
| 2001 | 367 |
| 2011 | 204 |
| 2021 | 129 |

== See also ==
- List of settlements in Arcadia
