= Atsicholos =

Atsicholos Ατσίχολος
- Community
- Location within Greece
- Coordinates: 37°31.7′N 22°01.7′E
- Country: Greece
- Administrative region: Peloponnese
- Regional unit: Arcadia
- Municipality: Megalopoli
- Municipal unit: Gortyna

Population (2021)
  - Community: 28
- Time zone: UTC+2 (EET)
  - Summer (DST): UTC+3 (EEST)

Atsicholos (Greek: Ατσίχολος) is a mountain village in the municipal unit Gortyna, Arcadia, Greece. It is considered a traditional settlement which is situated on a mountain slope above the right bank of the river Lousios, near its confluence with the Alfeios. It is 2 km east of Vlachorraptis, 4 km west of Elliniko and 5 km north of Karytaina.

The village has significant Byzantine-era remains, and sights include the local Church of St. Athanasios, a laurel forest and the nearby monastery of Panagia Kalamiou.

== Population ==
Year	Population
1981	80
1991	61
2001	63
2011	45
2021	28

== See also ==
- List of settlements in Arcadia
- List of traditional settlements of Greece
