= Kotylio =

Kotylio Κοτύλιο
- Community
- Location within Greece
- Coordinates: 37°28′N 22°00′E
- Country: Greece
- Administrative region: Peloponnese
- Regional unit: Arcadia
- Municipality: Megalopoli
- Municipal unit: Gortyna

Population (2021)
  - Community: 58
- Time zone: UTC+2 (EET)
  - Summer (DST): UTC+3 (EEST)

Kotylio (Greek: Κοτύλιο, also Κωτίλιο - Kotilio) is a village and a community in the municipal unit Gortyna, southwest Arcadia, Greece. It is situated on the northeastern slope of Mount Lykaion on a height of ca. 900 m, 3 km from the border with Elis. It is 4 km west of Karytaina, 6 km southeast of Theisoa, 8 km east of Andritsaina and 15 km northwest of Megalopoli. The community includes the small villages Palatos and Strongylo.

== History ==
In the immediate surroundings, five archaeological findspots have been found that might originally have been ancient watchtowers but that were changed and reused after antiquity.

Before 1927, Kotylio was known as Dragoumano (Δραγουμάνο, cf. dragoman). During the first battles of the Greek War of Independence in March 1821, the inhabitants of the village provided the information on the movements of Ottoman troops. This allowed Theodoros Kolokotronis to ambush them on 27 March in the straits of Agiothanasis, near Kourounios, in what is considered the first pitched battle between Greeks and Turks during the War of Independence.

On top of Mount Lykaion, every four years, the locals organize athletic and musical games in imitation of the ancient custom.

== Population ==
Year	Population village	Population community
1981	210	-
1991	261	-
2001	148	206
2011	64	82
2021	46	58

== See also ==
- List of settlements in Arcadia
