= Gortys (Arcadia) =

Town in ancient Arcadia

Coordinates: 37°32′23″N 22°02′43″E

Gortys (Ancient Greek: Γόρτυς), or Gortyna (Γόρτυνα), was a town of ancient Arcadia in the district Cynuria, situated near the river Gortynius (Γορτύνιος), also called Lusius (Λούσιος) nearer its sources, which was a tributary of the Alpheius, and was remarkable for the coldness of its waters.

The town is said to have been founded by Gortys, a son of Stymphalus, and is described by Pausanias as a village in his time, though it had formerly been a considerable city. Most of its inhabitants were removed to Megalopolis upon the foundation of the latter city in 371 BCE; but it must have continued to be a place of some importance, since Polybius says that it was taken by Euripidas, the general of the Eleians, in the Social War in 219 BCE. At that time it was subject to Thelpusa. It contained a celebrated temple of Asclepius, built of Pentelic marble, and containing statues of Asclepius and Hygieia by Scopas. Cicero alludes to this temple, when he says that near the river Lusius was the sepulchre of one of the Aesclepii, of whom he reckoned three.

Its site is located near the modern Atsicholos, near the road to Elliniko. The ruins of Gortys were excavated between 1940 and 1956. The remains of several fortifications, temples and baths have been found.
