= Trapezus (Arcadia) =

Town of ancient Arcadia

Coordinates: 37°27′23″N 22°03′39″E

Trapezus or Trapezous (Ancient Greek: Τραπεζοῦς, romanized: Trapezoûs, lit. 'table-like') was a town of ancient Arcadia, in the district Parrhasia, a little to the left of the river Alpheius. Its site is near modern Mavria, in the municipal unit of Gortyna.

It is said to have derived its name from its founder Trapezeus, the son of Lycaon, or from trapeza (τράπεζα, 'a table') because Zeus here overturned the table on which Lycaon offered him cooked human flesh. The mythological Arcadian king Hippothous was said to have transferred the seat of government from Tegea to Trapezus. On the foundation of Megalopolis, in 371 BC, the inhabitants of Trapezus refused to remove to the new city; and having thus incurred the anger of the other Arcadians, they quitted Peloponnesus, and took refuge in Trapezus on the Pontus Euxeinus (modern Trabzon), where they were received as a kindred people. The statues of some of their gods were removed to Megalopolis, where they were seen by Pausanias.

== See also ==
- List of Ancient Greek cities
