= Lousios =

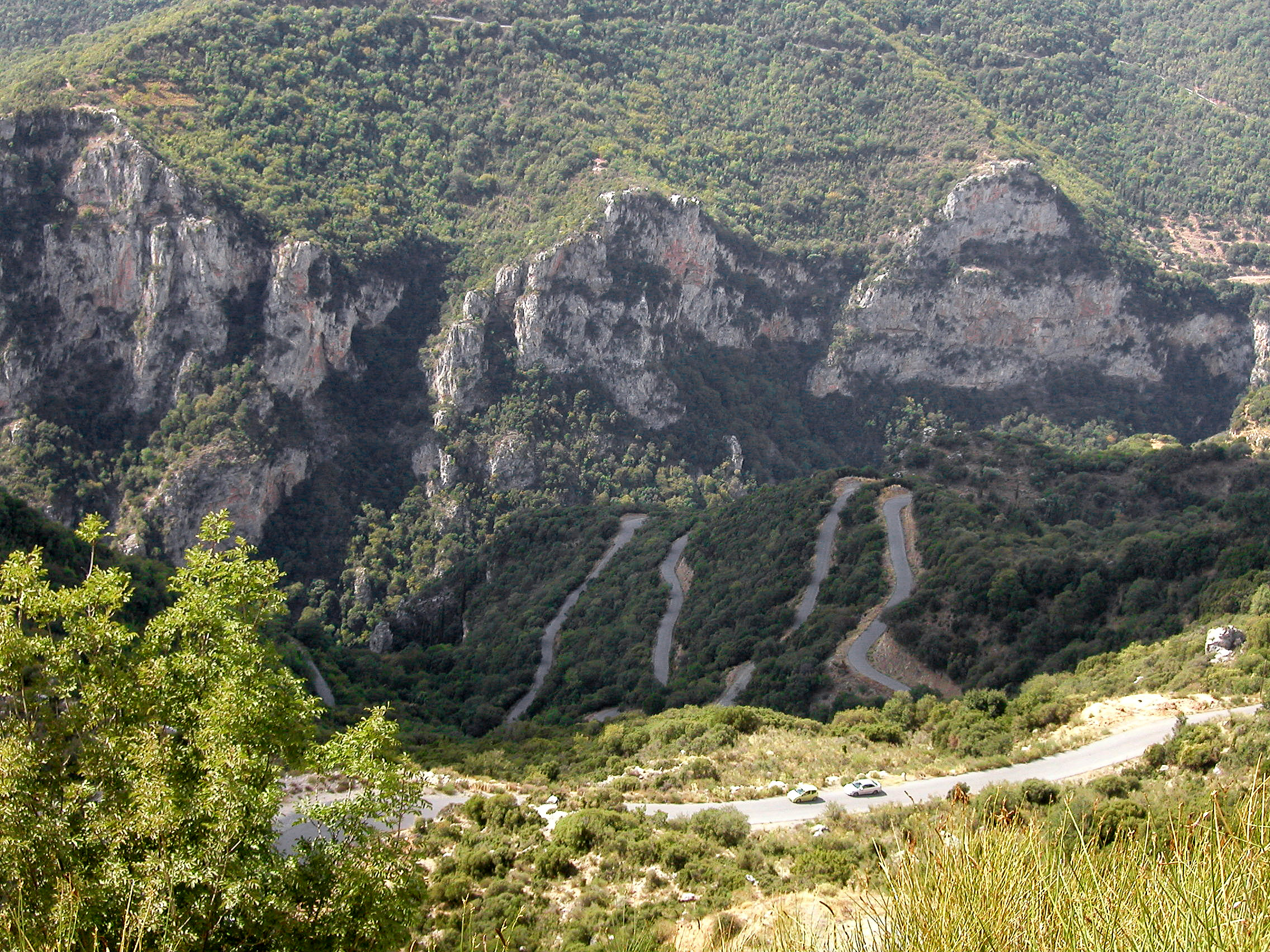
- Lousios Gorge

Location
- Country: Greece

Physical characteristics
- Source
  - location: Peloponnese
- Mouth
  - location: Alfeios
  - coordinates: 37°30′6″N 22°1′15″E
- Length: 15 km (9.3 mi)

Basin features
- Progression: Alfeios→ Ionian Sea

The Lousios (Greek: Λούσιος; Latin: Lusius), also known in antiquity as Gortynius or Gortynios (Ancient Greek: Γορτύνιος), is a river and a gorge in western Arcadia that stretches from Karytaina north to Dimitsana in Greece. The river begins near Lykochori and flows through the Lousios Gorge. The river is treacherous and flows rapidly. It empties into the Alfeios 2.5 kilometres (1.6 mi) northwest of Karytaina and south of Atsicholos.

The river forms a deep, narrow gorge. Its length is approximately 15 km (9.3 mi) from north to south and its width is approximately 2 km (1.2 mi) wide. The gorge is very popular amongst hikers. At the northern end of the gorge lies the town of Dimitsana. At the southern end is the ancient city of Gortys with the temple of Asclepius. Much of the gorge is heavily forested, and there are steep cliffs.

According to tradition, the river took its name from Zeus, the father of the Olympian gods, who according to Pausanias washed at its sources after his birth. Pausanias also considered Lousios the coldest river in the known world. The Lousios gorge is also known as the "Mount Athos of the Peloponnese" on account of the many monasteries that dot its walls: the Timiou Prodromou, Philosophou, Aimyalon, Panagias Kalamiou monasteries, and the Church of St. Andrew in Gortys. The gorge also features several old water-mills for tabac and gunpowder production.

== Nearest places ==
- Lykochori
- Dimitsana, east of the river
- Stemnitsa, east of the river
- Gortyna, west of the river
- Atsicholos, west of the river
- Elliniko, east of the river

== Gallery ==
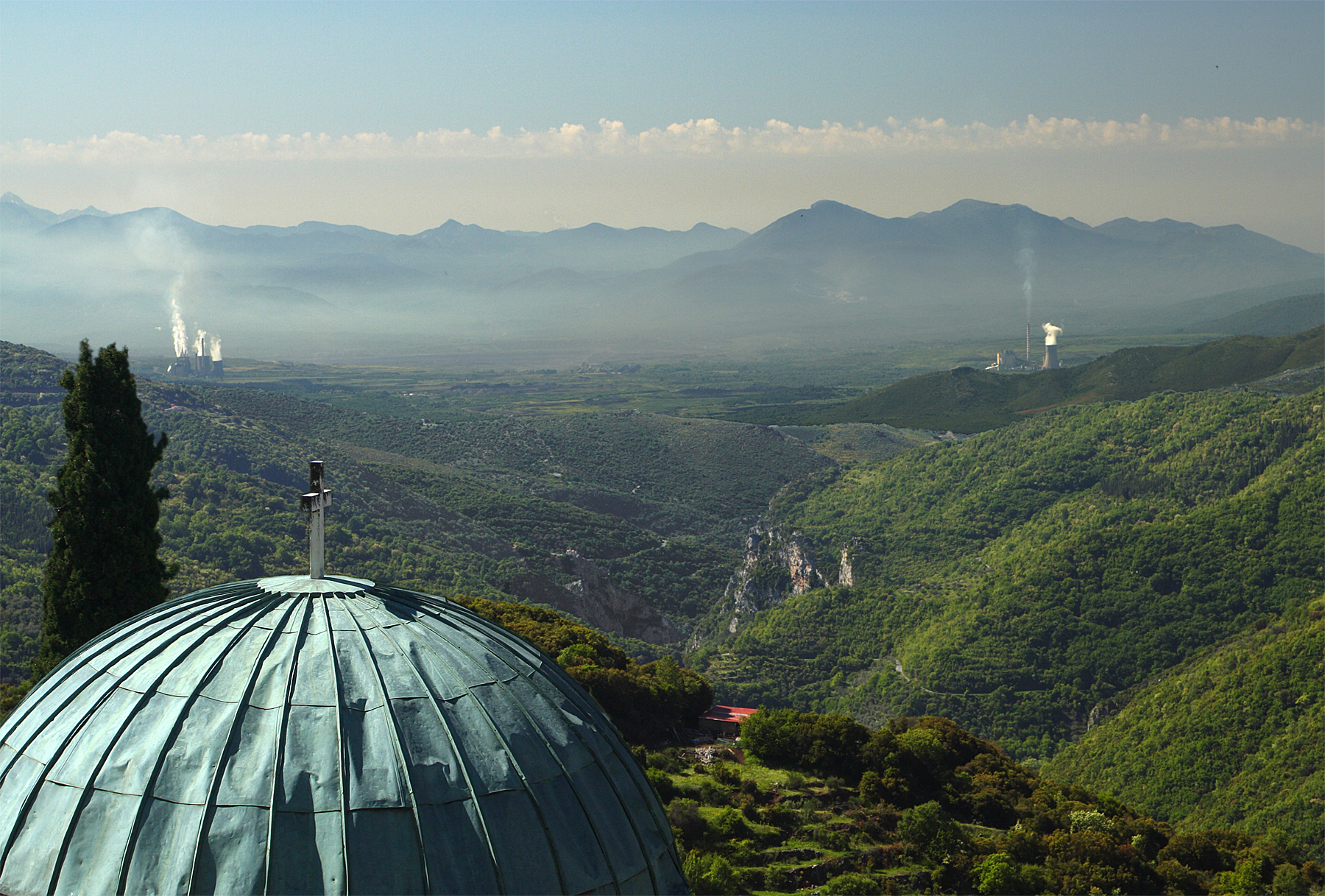
A view of Megalopoli and the Alfeios valley from Dimitsana

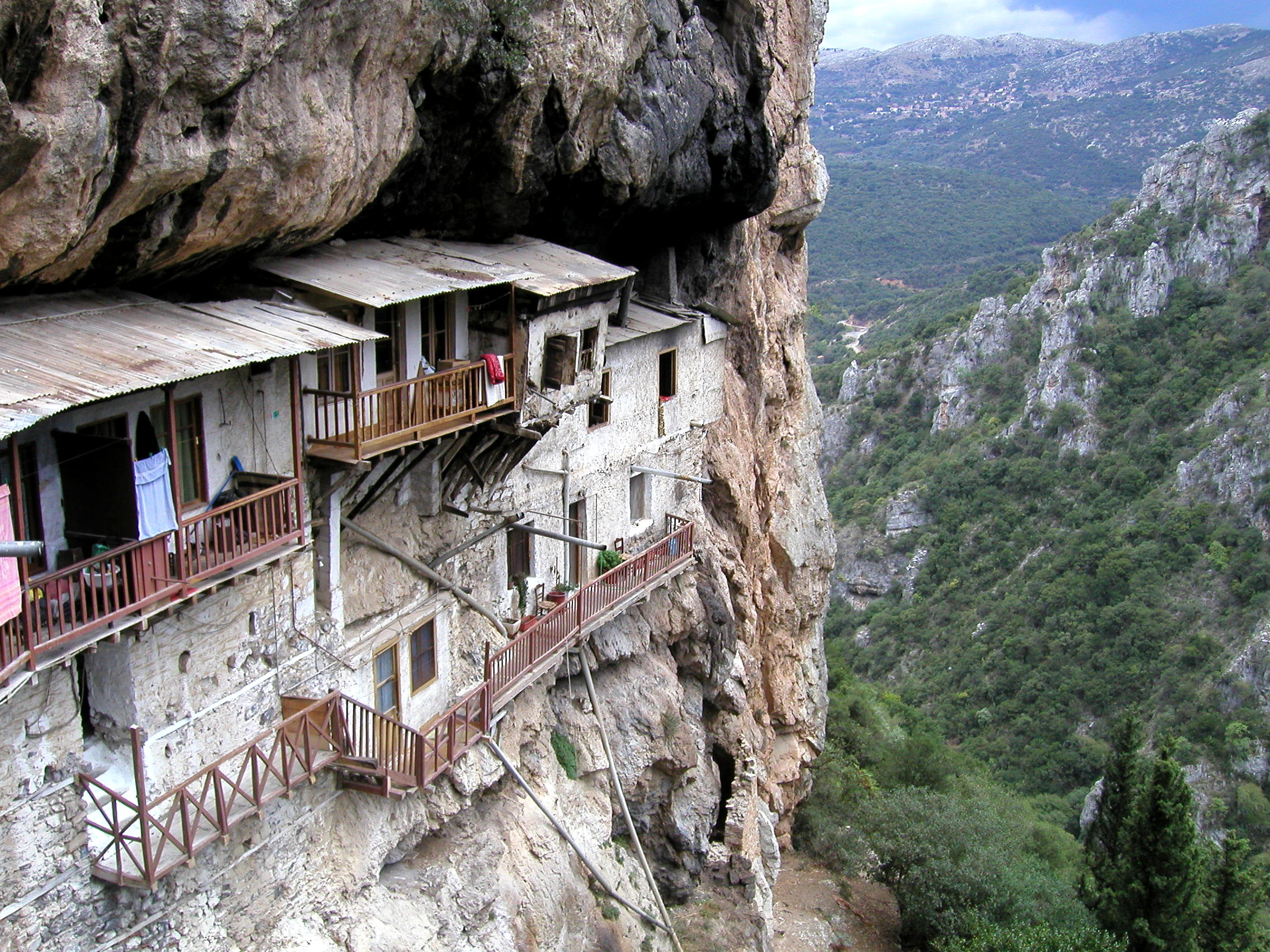
Prodromou Monastery

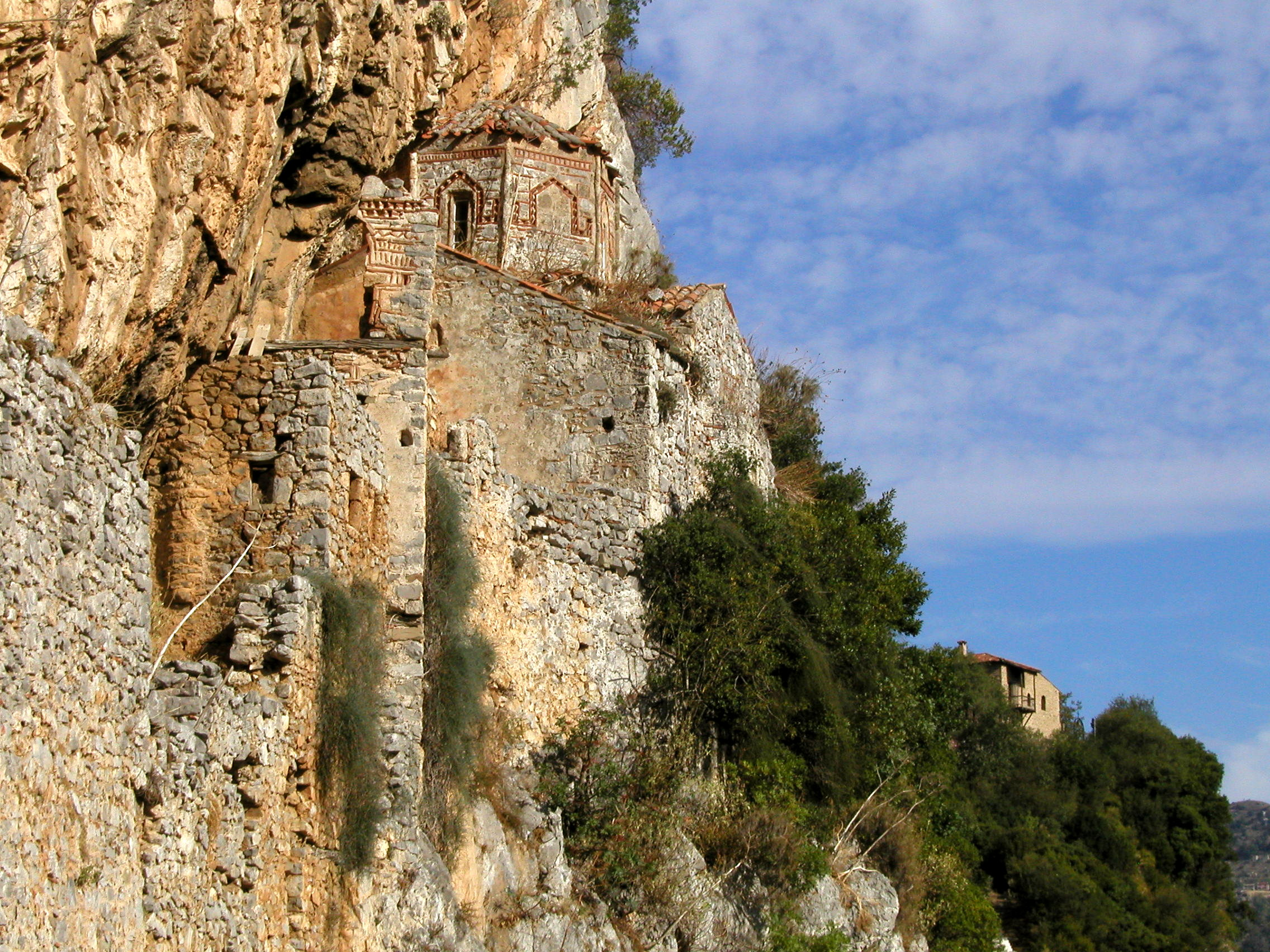
Philosophou Monastery

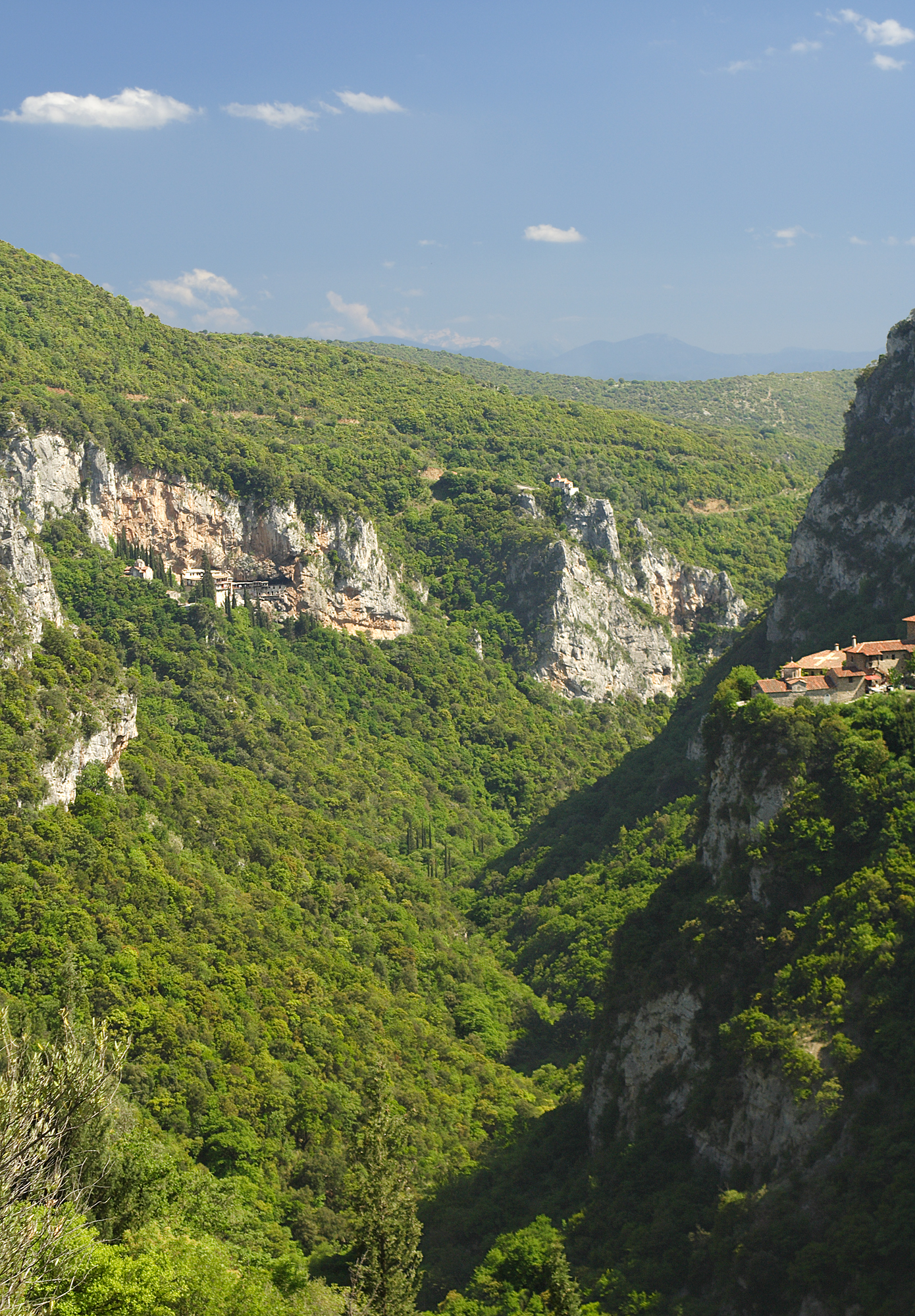
Prodromou Monastery at left, Philosophou Monastery at right

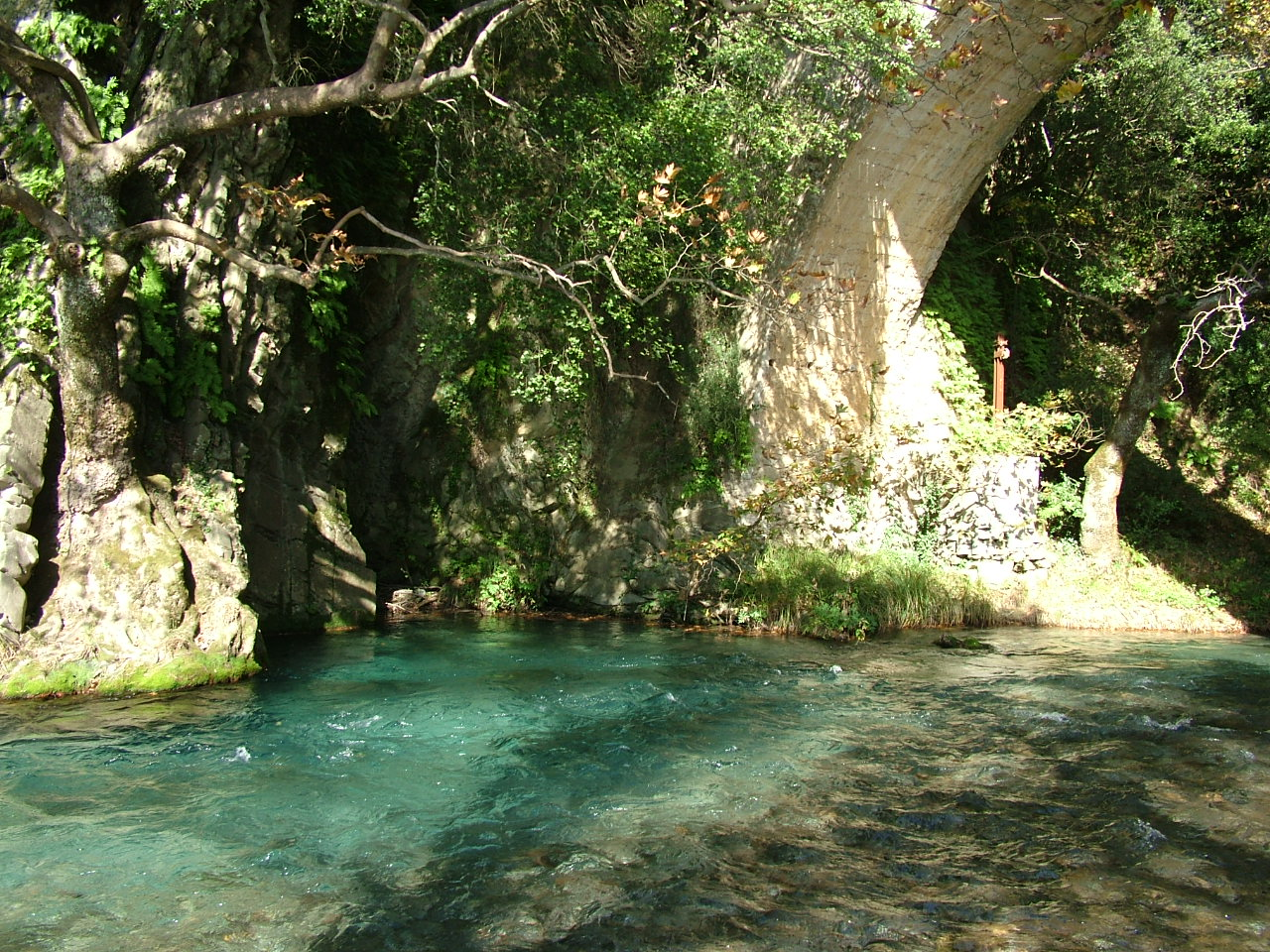
Lousios river
