= Alpide belt =

Belt of Eurasian mountain ranges

- Alpine-Himalayan orogenic belt
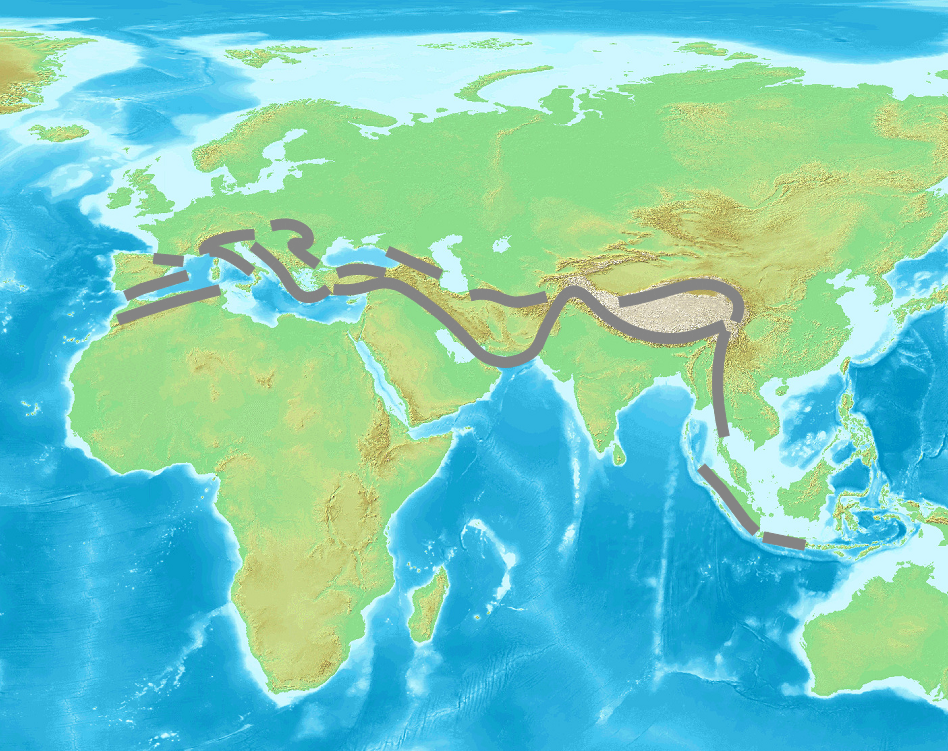
- Approximate extent of the Alpide orogenic system

Highest point
- Peak: Mount Everest
- Elevation: 8,848.86 m (29,031.7 ft)

Dimensions
- Length: 15,000 km (9,300 mi) E–W in the west, N–S in the east

Naming
- Etymology: Derived from Alps

Geography
- Mesozoic oceanic platform: Southern Eurasia, northern Africa, central Asian subcontinent, southeast Asia

Geology
- Formed by: compressive forces at aligned convergent plate boundaries
- Orogenies: Alpine (in west), Himalayan (in east)
- Mountain type: Folded mountain ranges

The Alpide belt or Alpine-Himalayan orogenic belt or Alpine-Persia–Tibet–Burma orogeny, or more recently and rarely the Tethyan orogenic belt, is a seismic and orogenic belt that includes an array of mountain ranges extending for more than 15,000 kilometres (9,300 mi) along the southern margin of Eurasia, stretching from Java and Sumatra, through the Indochinese Peninsula, the Himalayas and Transhimalayas, the mountains of Iran, the Caucasus, Anatolia, the Mediterranean, and out into the Atlantic.

It includes, from west to east, the major ranges of the Atlas Mountains, the Alps, the Caucasus Mountains, Alborz, Hindu Kush, Karakoram, and the Himalayas. It is the second most seismically active region in the world, after the circum-Pacific belt (the Ring of Fire), with 17% of the world's largest earthquakes.

The belt is the result of Mesozoic-to-Cenozoic-to-recent closure of the Tethys Ocean and process of collision between the northward-moving African, Arabian, and Indian plates with the Eurasian plate. Each collision results in a convergent boundary, a topic covered in plate tectonics. The approximate alignment of so many convergent boundaries trending east to west, first noticed by the Austrian geologist Eduard Suess, suggests that once many plates were one plate, and the collision formed one subduction zone, which was oceanic, subducting the floor of Tethys.

Suess called the single continent Gondwana, after some rock formations in India, then part of the supercontinent of Gondwana, which had earlier divided from another supercontinent, Laurasia, and was now pushing its way back. Eurasia descends from Laurasia, the Laurentia part having split away to the west as a consequence of the formation of the North Atlantic Ocean. As Tethys closed, Gondwana pushed up mountain ranges on the southern margin of Eurasia.

== Brief history of the concept ==
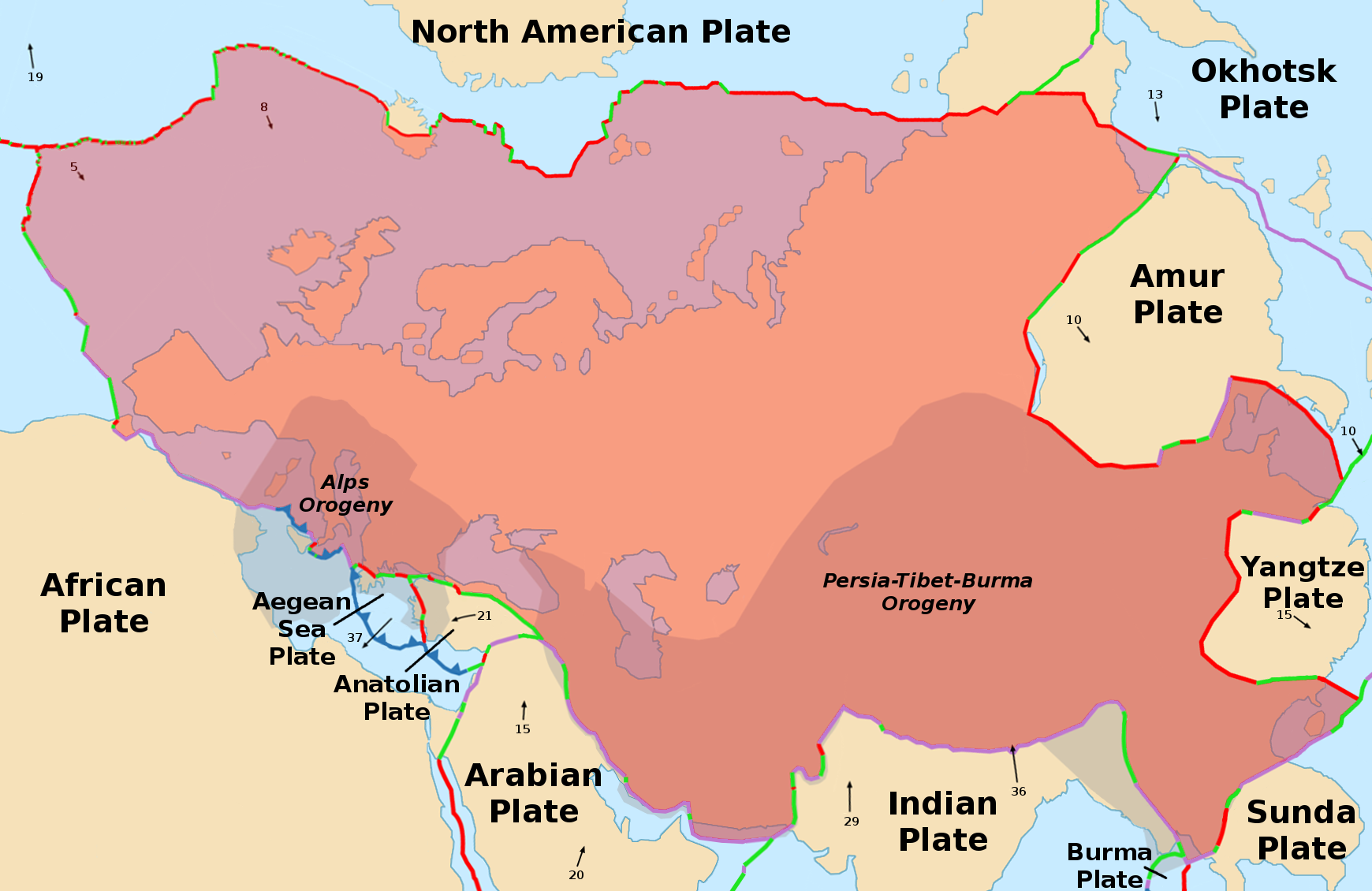
Eurasian Plate

The Alpide belt is a concept from modern historical geology, the study in geologic time of the events that shaped the surface of the Earth. The topic began suddenly in the mid-19th century with the evolutionary biologists. The early historical geologists, such as Charles Darwin and Charles Lyell, arranged fossils and layers of sedimentary rock containing them into time periods, of which the framework remains.

The late 19th century was a period of synthesis, in which geologists attempted to combine all the detail into the big picture. The first of his type, Eduard Suess, used the term "comparative orography" to refer to his method of comparing mountain ranges, parallel to "comparative anatomy" and "comparative philology.

His work preceded plate tectonics and continental drift. This pre-tectonic phase lasted until about 1950, when the drift theory won the field just as suddenly as had the evolutionist. The concepts and language of the comparative graphists were kept with some modification, but were explained in new ways.

=== Suess's subsidence theory ===
The author of the concept of a trans-Eurasian zone of subsidence, which he called Tethys, was Eduard Suess. He knew it had been a subsidence because it expressed deposits of the Mesozoic, now indurated into layers and raised into highlands by compressional force. Suess had discovered the zone during his early work on the Alps. He spent the better part of his career following the zone in detail, which he assembled in one ongoing work, das Antlitz der Erde, "The Face of the Earth." Like a human face, the Earth's face has lineaments. Suess's topic was the definition and classification of the lineaments of this zone, which he traced from one end of Eurasia to the other, ending on the east with the Malay Peninsula.

Suess looked, as did all geologists, at the strata and content of sedimentary rock, deposited as sediment in the oceanic basins, indurated under the pressure of the depths, and raised later under horizontal pressure into folds of mountain chains. What he added to the field is the study of what he called the "trend-lines" or directions of mountains chains. These were to be discovered by examining their strikes, or intersections with the surface. He soon discovered what are known today as convergent plate borders, which are chains of mountains raised by the compression or subduction of one plate under another, but knowledge was not in such a state that he could recognize them as that. He concerned himself instead with the patterns.

== Main ranges (from west to east) ==
- Cantabrian Mountains (incl. the Basque Mountains), Sistema Central, Sistema Ibérico, Pyrenees, Alps, Carpathians, Balkan Mountains (Balkanides), Rila-Rhodope massifs, Thracian Sea islands, Crimean Mountains – entirely in Europe
- Atlas and Rif Mountains in Northern Africa, Baetic System (Sierra Nevada and Balearic Islands), Apennine Mountains, Dinaric Alps, Pindus (Hellenides), and Mount Ida;
- Caucasus Mountains (on the limits between Asia and Europe), Kopet Mountains, Pamir, Alay Mountains, Tian Shan, Altai Mountains, Sayan Mountains;
- Pontic Mountains, Armenian highlands, Alborz, Hindu Kush, Kunlun Mountains, Hengduan Mountains, Annamite Range, Titiwangsa Mountains, Barisan Mountains – entirely in Asia;
- Taurus Mountains, Troodos Mountains, Zagros Mountains, Makran Highland, Sulaiman Mountains, Karakoram, Himalayas, Transhimalaya, Patkai, Chin Hills, Arakan Mountains, Andaman and Nicobar Islands – entirely in Asia.

Indonesia lies between the Pacific Ring of Fire along the northeastern islands adjacent to and including New Guinea and the Alpide belt along the south and west from Sumatra, Java and the Lesser Sunda Islands (Bali, Flores, and Timor). The 2004 Indian Ocean earthquake just off the coast of Sumatra was located within the Alpide belt.

== Etymology ==
The word Alpide is a term first coined in German by Austrian geologist Eduard Suess in his 1883 magnum opus Das Antlitz der Erde and later popularized in English-language scientific literature by Turkish geologist and historian A. M. Celâl Şengör in a 1984 paper on the topic. The term adds the suffix -ides, derived from the Ancient Greek patronymic/familial suffix -ίδης (-ídēs), to the Alps, suggesting a "family" of related orogens. The term belt refers to the fact that the Alpides form a long, mostly unbroken chain of orogens running west to east along the southern edge of Eurasia.

== Orogeny ==
If "Alpide" is taken in Kober's sense to mean the last and current of a collective group of contemporaneous ridges over the entire Tethyan region, then "Alpine orogeny" is used collectively of all the orogenies required to create the Alpides, a definition that is far from the original meanings of Alpide and Alpine, representing a specialized geologic usage.

== See also ==
- Geology of the Alps
- Geology of the Jura Massif – Thrust belt
- Geology of the Himalayas – Origins and structure of the Himalayan Mountain range
- Alpine orogeny—Formation of the Alpide belt

== General and cited references ==
- Suess, Eduard (1904). Sollas, W. J. (ed.). The Face of the Earth [das Antlitz der Erde]. Vol. I. Translated by Sollas, Hertha B. C. Oxford: Clarendon Press.
- Suess, Eduard (1908). Sollas, W. J. (ed.). The Face of the Earth [das Antlitz der Erde]. Vol. III. Translated by Sollas, Hertha B. C. (Revised ed.). Oxford: Clarendon Press.
