= Karytaina =

Village in Arcadia, Greece

Karytaina Καρύταινα
- Community
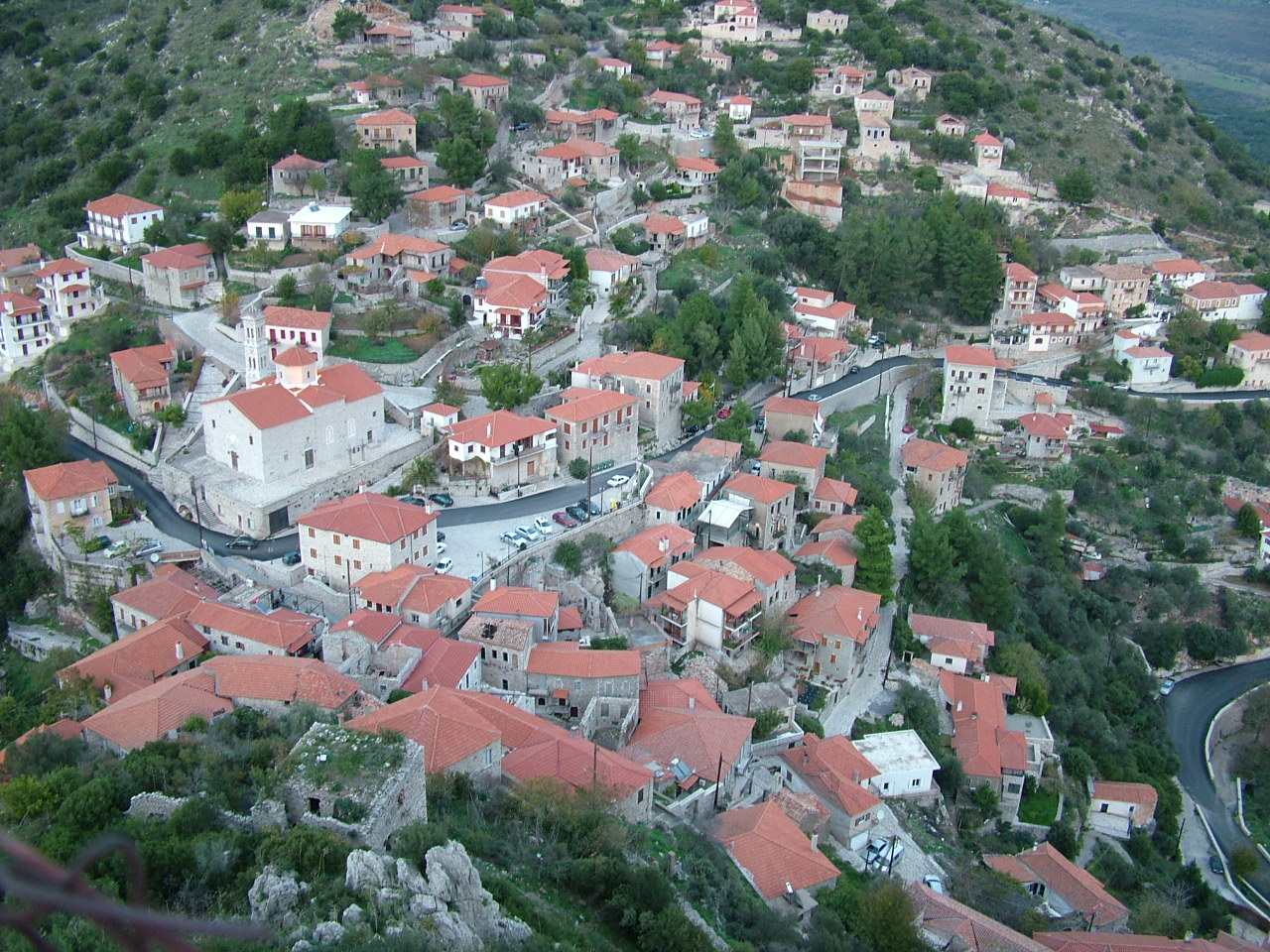

- Location within Greece
- Coordinates: 37°29′N 22°03′E
- Country: Greece
- Administrative region: Peloponnese
- Regional unit: Arcadia
- Municipality: Megalopoli
- Municipal unit: Gortyna

Population (2021)
  - Community: 163
- Time zone: UTC+2 (EET)
  - Summer (DST): UTC+3 (EEST)

Karytaina or Karitaina (Greek: Καρύταινα or Καρίταινα) is a village and a community in Arcadia, Greece. Karytaina is situated on a hill on the right bank of the river Alpheios, near its confluence with the Lousios. The village dates back to the Middle Ages, but its history is unknown before the Crusader conquest ca. 1205. Karytaina became the seat of a barony under the Frankish Principality of Achaea, and the Castle of Karytaina was built in the mid-13th century on a steep rocky outcrop by Baron Geoffrey of Briel. The area returned to Byzantine control in 1320, and came under Ottoman control in 1460. After a brief period of Venetian rule (1687–1715), Karytaina returned to Ottoman control, and prospered as an administrative and commercial centre. Karytaina and its inhabitants were among the first to rise up during the Greek War of Independence of 1821–29. Today Karytaina is a protected traditional settlement and has, alongside the remains of its Frankish castle, several other medieval and Ottoman monuments.

== Location ==
Karytaina is 54 km (34 mi) from the capital of Arcadia, Tripoli, 20 km (12 mi) from Megalopoli and 17 km (11 mi) from Stemnitsa, built on the slopes of the hill of Achreiovouni, some 550 m above sea level.

The town was formerly the seat of the municipality of Gortyna, which also included the villages of Atsicholos, Katsimpalis, Kotylio, Kourounios, Kyparissia, Mavria, Sarakini, Vlachorraptis, Zoni, Palaiokastro, Karvounari, Kryoneri, Kalyvakia, Strongylo, Palatou. Since the 2011 local government reform it is part of the municipality of Megalopoli.

== Ηistory ==
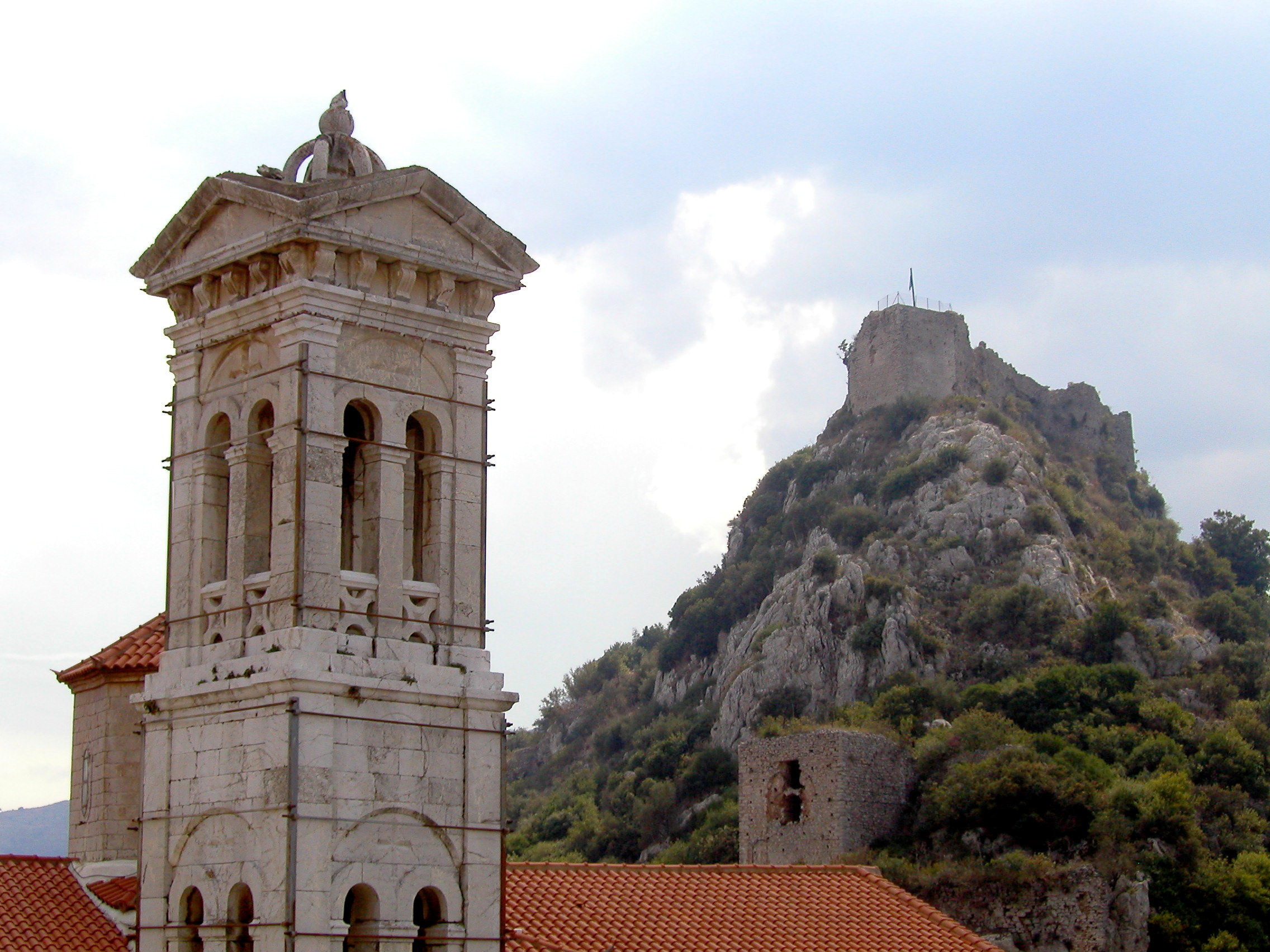
Belltower with the Karytaina Castle in the background

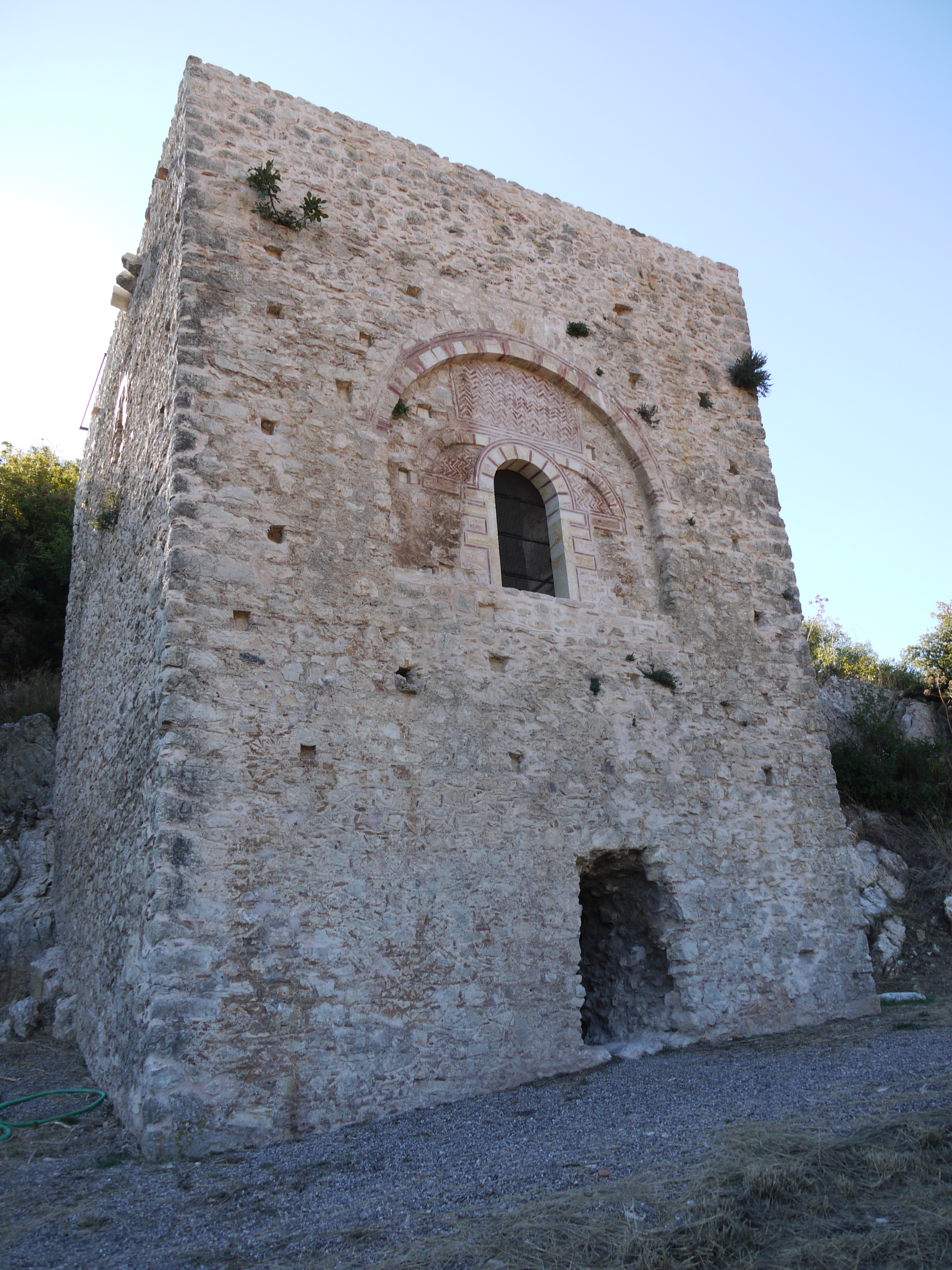
Old tower house

The site of Karytaina is often identified with the ancient city of Brenthe, but although a settlement certainly existed there before the Frankish conquest in c. 1205, few archaeological remains survive. The Greek archaeologist N.K. Moutsopoulos has suggested the existence of a 12th-century church inside the Karytaina Castle. The name of the town itself is of uncertain provenance: the most common theories are that it derives either from a Slavic root or is a corruption of Gortyna, but it has also been suggested that it derives from the Greek word for walnut, karydion, or from the female name Karitaina.

With the Frankish conquest and the establishment of the Principality of Achaea, Karytaina became one of the secular baronies into which the Morea was divided by the Crusaders. Karytaina was one of the largest baronies, and of special strategic importance: its position allowed it to control the southern part of the mountainous Skorta region and, through the ravine of the Alpheios valley, the main route connecting the Arcadian plateau with the coastal plains of Elis. The barony belonged to the Briel or Bruyères family. The third baron, Geoffrey of Briel, built the Castle of Karytaina and played a major role in the affairs of Frankish Greece in the middle of the 13th century, repeatedly defying even the Prince William II of Villehardouin. After Geoffrey's death in 1275, the barony gradually reverted to the princely domain, and was later held by Isabella of Villehardouin and her daughter, Margaret of Savoy. From the late 13th century, Karytaina was increasingly threatened by the attacks of the Byzantine Greeks of Mystras, until it finally fell to them in 1320.

The town and its castle lost their importance thereafter, and are only intermittently mentioned in the 14th–15th centuries until the time of the Ottoman conquest in 1460. The 17th-century Ottoman traveller Evliya Çelebi mentions the town but did not visit it, while under Venetian rule (1687–1715) only the town, and not the castle, is mentioned by the Venetian governors. During the second period of Ottoman rule after 1715, the castle was abandoned and fell in ruins, and remained so until the 19th century. The town itself grew in importance as the centre of a district (kaza) and a marketplace, especially for wheat; it was also a centre for silk and carpet manufacture. At the turn of the 18th century, François Pouqueville recorded that the district comprised 130 villages with 28,170 inhabitants, of which 3,000 in Karytaina itself.

Karytaina was taken by the Greek rebels on the outbreak of the Greek War of Independence in 1821, and formed one of the first strongholds of the rebellion, earning the nickname "Bastion of 1821". In 1826 Theodoros Kolokotronis used it as a base of operations against Ibrahim Pasha of Egypt and as a shelter for women and children.

== Sights ==
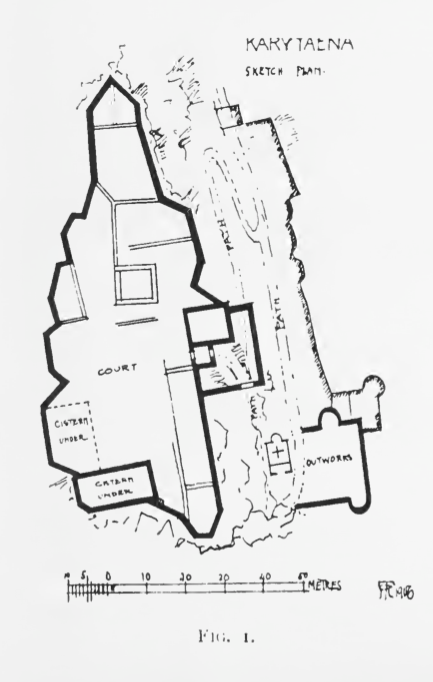
Outline of the Castle of Karytaina

Κarytaina has been listed as a protected traditional settlement. Its unique townscape has earned Karytaina the moniker of the "Greek Toledo", and was depicted on the reverse of the Greek 5000 drachmas banknote in 1984–2001.

The main sight is the 13th-century Frankish castle, built at the top of the hill, with its highest point rising above the town. It consists of a triangular circuit wall, over 110 m in the long sides and ca. 40 m at its base, and a central structure which served as the barons' residence, built above the castle cistern. The castle was repaired by Kolokotronis, who erected a small church dedicated to the Virgin Mary, and built his house outside the walls.

Also to the Frankish period, but repaired by the Byzantine lord Raoul Manuel Melikes in 1439/40, dates the 50-metre-long (160 ft) bridge that crosses the Alpheios over five arches. The town also has several churches, of which the most notable are the cathedral of the Annunciation (Ευαγγελισμός της Θεοτόκου), built in 1878; the 11th-century Church of St. Nicholas (Άγιος Νικόλαος); the 15th-century Church of the Life-giving Spring (Ζωοδόχος Πηγή), distinguished by its tall bell-tower; the church of St. Athanasios, at the entrance of the town, dedicated to Karytaina's patron saint, who was the bishop of the city in the early 18th century. Further landmarks also include ruins of Byzantine-era tower, of a hammam (bathhouse), and the large Kavia cave (σπήλαιο Κάβιας). Karytaina hosts several events in August, most notably the annual Women's Bazaar.

Nearby sights include the Lousios Gorge. Apart from its natural beauty, which includes the Vrontou waterfall, the gorge is also notable as the "Mount Athos of the Peloponnese" on account of the many monasteries that dot its walls.

== Historical population ==
Year	Population
1920	881
1928	1,083
1940	892
1951	725
1961	577
1971	456
1981	304
1991	248
2001	257
2011	274
2021	163

== Notable individuals ==
- Saint Athanasios (1664–1735), Bishop of Christianoupolis and Karytaina from 1711 until his death, known for his charitable work
- Nikolaos Dimitrakopoulos (1864–1921), jurist and Minister for Justice of Greece
- Dimosthenis Valavanis (1829–1854), poet

== See also ==
- List of settlements in Arcadia
- List of traditional settlements of Greece

== Sources ==
- Bon, Antoine (1969). La Morée franque. Recherches historiques, topographiques et archéologiques sur la principauté d'Achaïe [The Frankish Morea. Historical, Topographic and Archaeological Studies on the Principality of Achaea] (in French). Paris: De Boccard.
- Gregory, Timothy E. (1991). "Karytaina". In Kazhdan, Alexander (ed.). The Oxford Dictionary of Byzantium. Oxford and New York: Oxford University Press. pp. 1108–1109. ISBN 0-19-504652-8.
- Miller, William (1921). Essays on the Latin Orient. Cambridge: Cambridge University Press.
