= Dulia, Democratic Republic of the Congo =

Dulia
- Village
- Location within Democratic Republic of the Congo
- Coordinates: 2.961599°N 24.141013°E
- Country: Democratic Republic of the Congo
- Province: Bas-Uélé
- Territory: Aketi Territory
- Chiefdom: Avuru Gatanga
- Elevation: 407 m (1,335 ft)

Dulia is a village in the Bas-Uélé province of the Democratic Republic of the Congo. It was a station on the defunct Vicicongo line, a railway.

== Location ==
Dulia is in the Bas-Uélé province, Democratic Republic of the Congo, in the Avuru Gatanga chiefdom of Aketi Territory. It is on the RN4 road between Buta to the east and Bondo to the northwest. It is at the end of the RN6 road from Aketi to the southwest. It is a few kilometers north of the Rubi River. The village is at an elevation of about 407 metres (1,335 ft).

== Facilities ==
Gold and diamond deposits have been reported in Dulia. It has a large diamond quarry.

Dulia has a health center, and is in the Aketi health zone.

The main axis of the Vicicongo line built by the Société des Chemins de Fer Vicinaux du Congo ran east from ran from Aketi through Komba to Dulia, then through Kotili to Buta.

== Sources ==
- "Dulia", Geonames
- "Node: Dulia (254107564)", OpenStreetMap
- Omasombo Tshonda, Jean (2014), Bas-Uele Pouvoirs locaux et économie agricole : héritages d’un passé brouillé (PDF) (in French), Musée royal de l’Afrique centrale, ISBN 978-9-4916-1586-3
