= Mavria =

Mavria Μαυριά
- Community
- Location within Greece
- Coordinates: 37°28′N 22°04′E
- Country: Greece
- Administrative region: Peloponnese
- Regional unit: Arcadia
- Municipality: Megalopoli
- Municipal unit: Gortyna

Population (2021)
  - Community: 19
- Time zone: UTC+2 (EET)
  - Summer (DST): UTC+3 (EEST)

Mavria (Greek: Μαυριά) is a village in the municipal unit of Gortyna, Arcadia, Greece. It is located near the left bank of the river Alfeios, 1 km north of Kyparissia, 4 km southeast of Karytaina and 9 km northwest of Megalopoli. There is a lignite mine east of the village.

The ancient city of Trapezus was situated near the village.

== Population ==
Year	Population
1981	95
1991	124
2001	49
2011	31
2021	19

== See also ==
- List of settlements in Arcadia
