= Hellenic orogeny =

Collective Noun

The Hellenic orogeny is a collective noun referring to multiple mountain building events that shaped the topography of the southern margin of Eurasia into what is now Greece, the Aegean Sea and western Turkey, beginning in the Jurassic. Prior to then the supercontinent, Pangaea, had divided along a divergent boundary into two continents, Gondwana land and Laurasia, separated by a primordial ocean, Paleo-Tethys Ocean. As the two continents continued to break up, Gondwana, pushed by divergent boundaries developing elsewhere, began to drift to the north, closing the sea. As it went it split off a number of smaller land masses, terranes, which preceded it to the north. The Hellenic orogeny is the story of the collision first of these terranes and then of Gondwana, reduced to Africa, with Eurasia, and the closing of Tethys to the Mediterranean. The process has been ongoing since the Jurassic and continues today.

== Sequence of the orogeny ==
In the late Jurassic, fragments of continental crust from the small content Cimmeria collided with Eurasia. Earlier, in the mid-Jurassic remnant oceanic crust formed ophiolites along the coast of Cimmeria. The oceanic crust of the Neotethys ocean subducted beneath the newly compounded Cimmerian-Eurasia continent, but obducted some more ophiolites onto the edge of the Cimmerian crust.

Tectonic activity resumed in the early Cenozoic when the small Apulia plate collided with the Cimmerian-Eurasian rocks causing intense imbrication and the deposition of the Pindos flysch. The final phase of the process came in the Miocene and Pliocene, during the Mesogean orogeny, when the combined Mesogean-African plate subducted beneath what is now Greece, the Aegean and parts of western Turkey. In the process, the Crete and southern Peloponessus core complexes were exhumed to the surface.

== Structural geology ==
The Hellenic orogen is made up of three orogenic belts. The Cimmerian orogenic belt in Greece comprises the Serbomacedonian, Circum Rhodope, Axios, Pelagonian and Rhodope zones, while the Bayburt, Sinop, Kirklareli and Sakarya zones are situated in Turkey. The Alpine orogenic belt includes Neo-Tethys oceanic sedimentary rocks, the Pindos-Subpelagonian ophiolites and the External Hellenides. Apatite and zircon analysis in the southern Aegean suggests that metamorphism in the Cenozoic phase of the orogeny never exceeded 300 degrees Celsius.
