= Kotili, Democratic Republic of the Congo =

Kotili
- Village
- Location within Democratic Republic of the Congo
- Coordinates: 2.85777°N 24.54681°E
- Country: Democratic Republic of the Congo
- Province: Bas-Uélé
- Territory: Buta Territory
- Elevation: 420 m (1,380 ft)

Kotili is a village in the Bas-Uélé province of the Democratic Republic of the Congo. It was a station on the defunct Vicicongo line, a railway.

== Location ==
Kotili is in the Bas-Uélé province, Democratic Republic of the Congo, in the west of the Buta Territory. It is on the RN4 road between Buta to the east and Dulia to the west, and is a few kilometers north of the Rubi River. It is at an elevation of about 420 metres (1,380 ft).

== Railway ==
The main axis of the Vicicongo line built by the Société des Chemins de Fer Vicinaux du Congo ran east from ran from Aketi through Komba to Dulia, then through Kotili to Buta.

== Sources ==
- Carte administrative du Territoire de Buta (PDF), CAID
- "Kotili", Geonames
- "Node: Kotili (254108411)", OpenStreetMap
- Omasombo Tshonda, Jean (2014), Bas-Uele Pouvoirs locaux et économie agricole : héritages d’un passé brouillé (PDF) (in French), Musée royal de l’Afrique centrale, ISBN 978-9-4916-1586-3
