= Hellenides =

Mountain range in the Balkan Peninsula of Southeastern Europe

- Albanides-Hellenides, Hellenides-Albanides
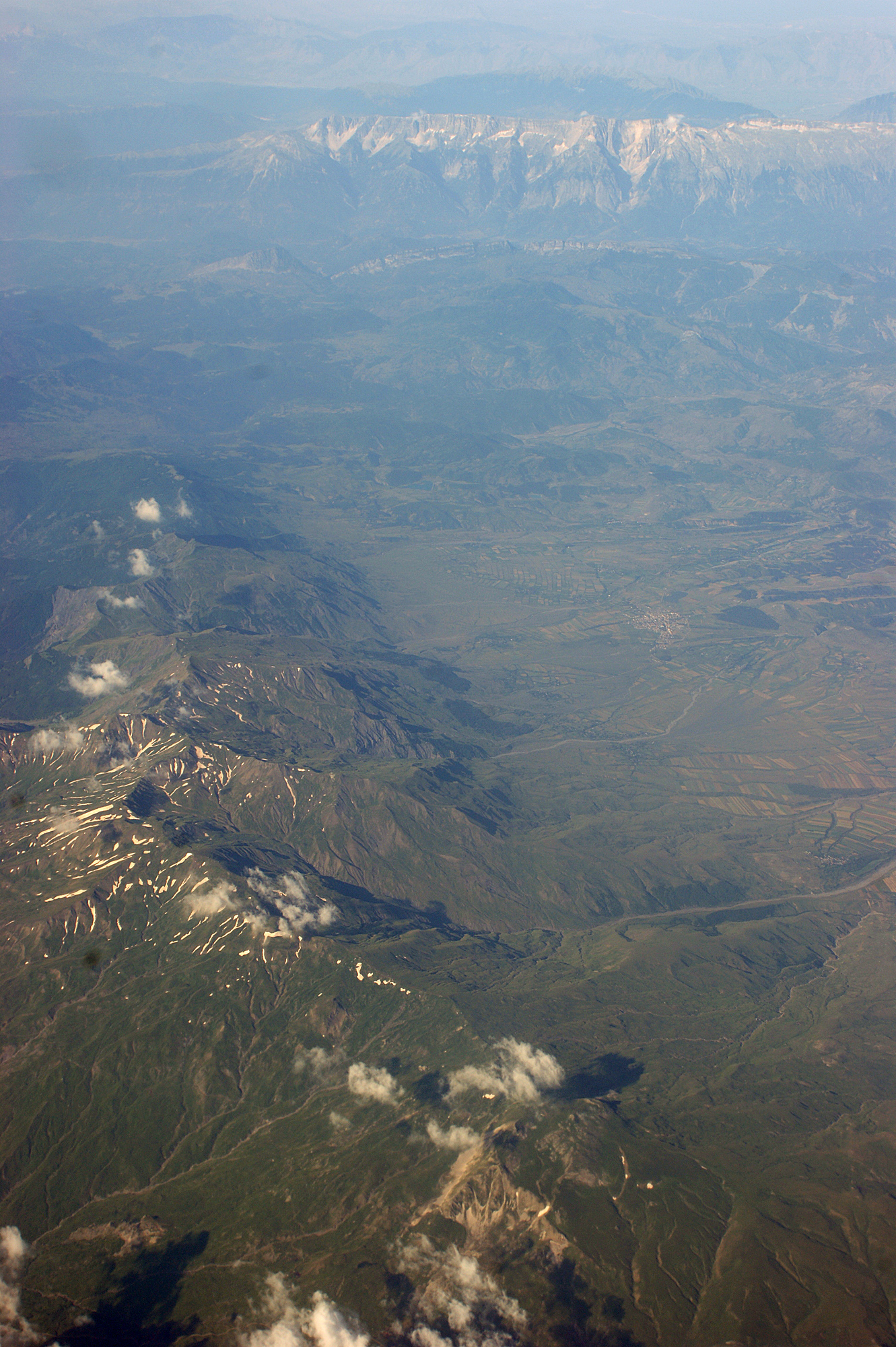
- Pindus Mountains from the air

Highest point
- Peak: Mount Olympus in Greece
- Elevation: 2,917.727 m (9,572.60 ft)
- Coordinates: 40°05′08″N 22°21′31″E

Geography
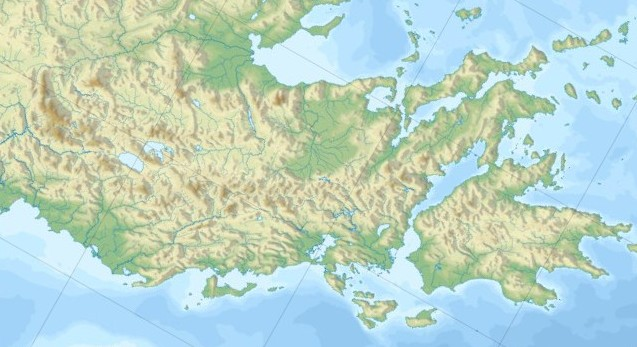
- Topography and relief of the Hellenides
- Countries: Albania; Kosovo; North Macedonia; Greece; Serbia
- Borders on: Dinarides, Rhodopes

Geology
- Rock age: Mesozoic era
- Rock type: Sedimentary

The Hellenides, also known as the Albanides-Hellenides (or the Hellenides-Albanides), are a mountain range in Southeast Europe. The Hellenides and Dinarides form a common orocline.

== Name ==
Geologically, the Hellenides and Dinarides share Late Cretaceous-Paleogene nappe sequences, so the main distinction between the two is tectonic: the Hellenides are characterised by retreating subduction, collision and slab bending, and the Dinarides by oblique dextral collision and slab tearing. The boundary between the two ranges is usually drawn between Prokletije in the Dinarides and Šar in the Hellenides. To emphasise the orogenic unity of the Hellenides and Dinarides, some authors avoid using the term Albanides for the northern segment of the Hellenides, while some Albanian authors treat it on an equal level with the Dinarides and Hellenides. In between, many scholars use terms like Albanides-Hellenides and Hellenides-Albanides to refer to the Hellenides. Among authors who use the term "Albanides," no consensus exists as to the line of separation between them and the Hellenides sensu stricto.

== Bibliography ==
- Ampatzidis, Dimitrios; Moschopoulos, Georgios; Mouratidis, Antonios; Styllas, Michael; Tsimerikas, Alexandros; Deligiannis, Vasileios-Klearchos; Voutsis, Nikolaos; Perivolioti, Triantafyllia-Maria; Vergos, Georgios S.; Plachtova, Alexandra (2023-04-01). "Revisiting the determination of Mount Olympus Height (Greece)". Journal of Mountain Science. 20 (4): 1026–1034. Bibcode:2023JMouS..20.1026A. doi:10.1007/s11629-022-7866-8. ISSN 1993-0321.
- Grund, Marc U.; Handy, Mark R.; Giese, Jörg; Gemignani, Lorenzo; Pleuger, Jan; Onuzi, Kujtim (2023-07-17). "Faulting, basin formation and orogenic arcuation at the Dinaric–Hellenic junction (northern Albania and Kosovo)" (PDF). International Journal of Earth Sciences. 112: 1613–1634. doi:10.1007/s00531-023-02318-1. eISSN 1437-3262.
- Aquilano, Antonello (2024-10-24). "Finding Local Stone for Façade Renewal in Finiq, Albania". The Scientific Journal of the Observatory of Mediterranean Basin (2): 310–319. doi:10.37199/o41009133. eISSN 2959-4081.
