= Cynuria (Arcadia) =

District of ancient Arcadia

Cynuria or Kynouria (Ancient Greek: ἡ Κυνουρία) was a district in ancient Arcadia mentioned only upon the occasion of the foundation of Megalopolis. It was situated north of Phigalice and Parrhasia. We may infer from the name that these Cynurians were the same as the Cynurians on the east coast of the ancient Peloponnesus, but we have no account of any historical connection between them.
