= Alfeios =

Alpheios Alpheus (Latinized), Alphios (Anglicized)
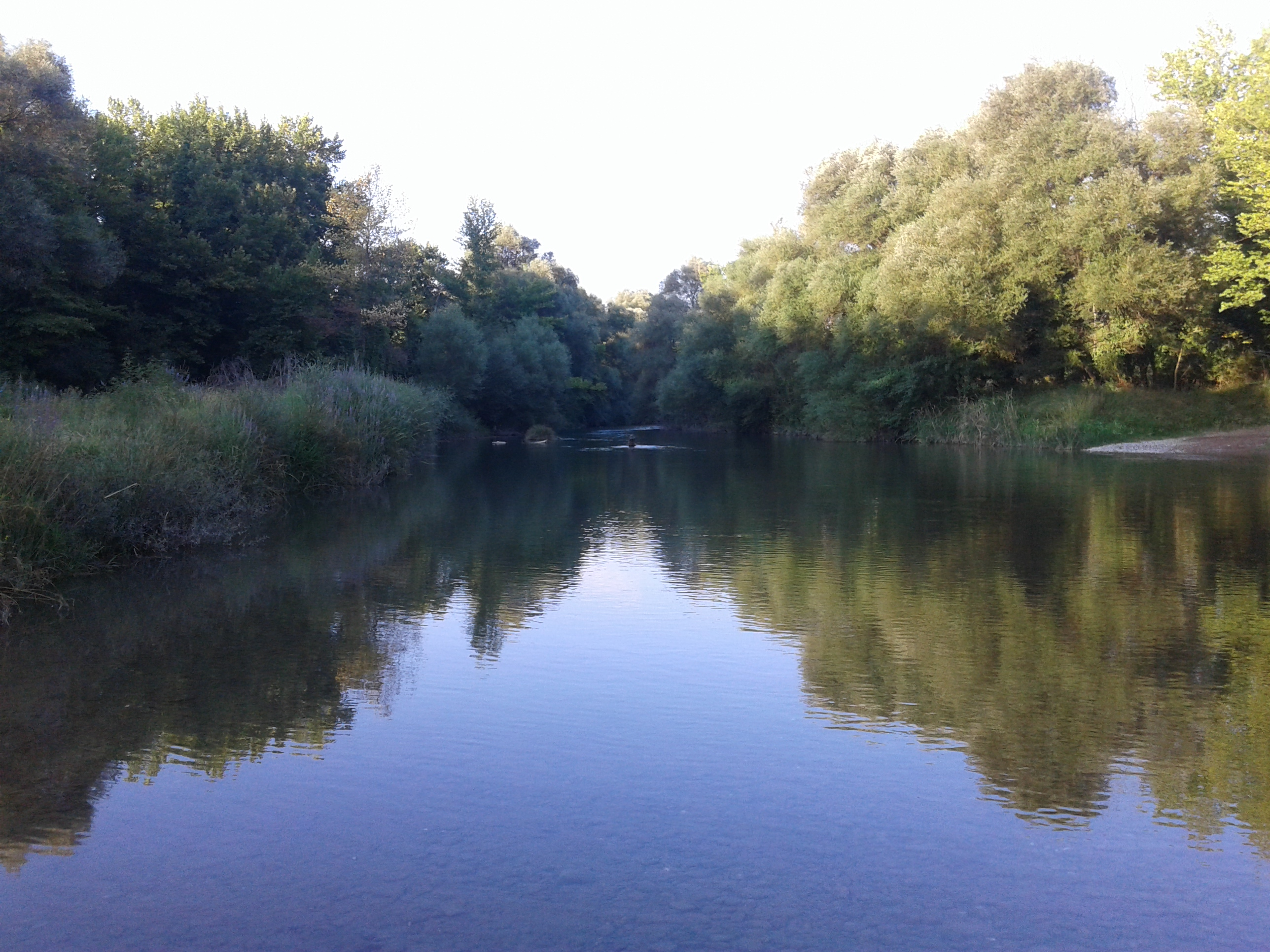
- Lower Alpheios

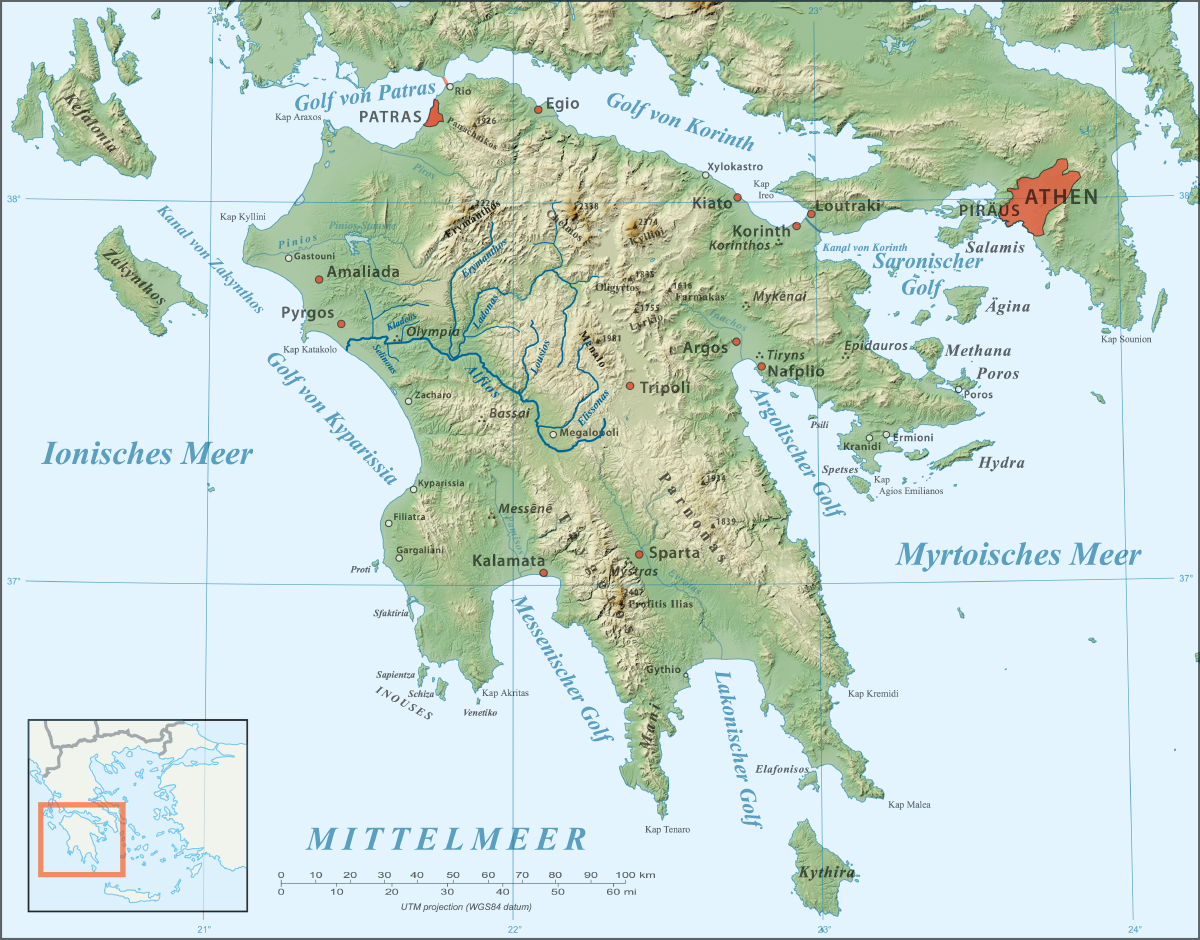
- Topographical map showing the Alpheios and its major tributaries.
- Etymology: "whitewater" (Frisk under Ἀλφός, "white")
- Native name: Αλφειός (Greek)

Location
- Country: Greece
- Regional units: Arcadia 60% Elis 30% Achaea 10%

Physical characteristics
- Source: Alpheios
  - location: Falaisia
  - coordinates: 37°12′07″N 22°08′17″E
  - elevation: 380 m (1,250 ft)
- Mouth: Ionian Sea
  - location: Gulf of Kyparissia
  - coordinates: 37°36′45″N 21°27′6″E
  - elevation: 0 m (0 ft)
- Length: 112 km (70 mi)
- Basin size: 3,658 km^{2} (1,412 sq mi)

Basin features
- Tributaries
  - right: Lousios, Ladon, Erymanthos

The Alpheios (Greek: Αλφειός, Ancient Greek: Ἀλφειός, Latin Alpheus), sometimes spelled Alfeiós, is the main stream of the Alpheios Valley drainage system, a dendritic type, originating on the north slopes of Mount Taygetus, located in the center of the Peloponnesus of Greece, and flowing to the northwest to the vicinity of Olympia, where it turns to the west and, after being impounded by the Flokas Dam, a hydroelectric facility, empties into the Gulf of Kyparissia of the Ionian Sea south of Pyrgos. The entrance into the gulf through agricultural land and across an unpopulated, sandy beach partially blocked by a spit is hydrologically unspectacular, with the water too shallow to be navigable by any but the smallest craft.

The concept of a single source has little meaning for most of the rivers of Greece, which begin as a confluence of multiple springs in the mountain valleys. There is almost never just one, although most may be unreported or neglected. Thus it is appropriate to speak "a source" or "the sources" but never "the source."

Nevertheless, competing villages sometimes claim to own "the source." Moreover, the sources are not geologically stable, but change frequently in history. In karst terrain, such as the Peloponnesus, the population is acutely aware that rivers may run underground for some distance. Thus the "source" of the Alpheios has always been a subject of debate and literary fantasies, some wild by modern geologic standards. Most recently attempts have been made to connect the Alpheios through underground channels to the "40 rivers" region of the high plateau of central Arcadia (around Tegea and Mantineia, etc.).

The Alpheios of today bears little resemblance to the historical Alpheios. Much of it has been widened by damming; large sections have been straightened by embankments; flood control works have been constructed; water for municipal use and irrigation is diverted all along the course; some sections are used for gravel mining; and waste water, fertilizer, and pesticides pollute it from one end to the other. It has been necessary to establish regular monitoring by the government and create substructure to make important decisions concerning the fate of the river.

Despite the recent alterations of man and the apparently random dendritic pattern in parts of the valley, a geologic pattern emerges that is too regular to be entirely random. The valley is a regular trough, or basin, from the coast to the interior. The dendrism is mainly right-bank. On the left is the long ridge of Mount Lykaion, relatively uneroded, suggesting that different types of rock occur on either side. After a divide the ridge continues as Mount Taygetus, and the valley as the Eurotas River valley, which extends south to the Gulf of Lakonia. The entire southwest Peloponnesus is split from Arcadia by this great trough, considered two basins, which must have been in place in some form before any extensive dendrism.

Scarps along the trough suggest that the two basins are rift valleys, depressions, or graben, caused by the ridges on each side moving away from each other. The whole, finger-like arrangement of the ridges in the south Peloponnesus is currently explained as a stretching, or extension, of the Peloponnesus in a NE-SW direction, pulling the troughs apart. The division between the ridges occurs because they were primordially compressed together in the Hellenic orogeny, becoming different modern zones of rock. Subsequent to the compressional regime back-arc extension of the Hellenic arc, the outer ring of islands, opened the Aegean Sea and initiated the extensional regime that is opening the Peloponnesus.

Fortuitously the right bank of the Alpheios Valley became a defensive zone for the protection of central Arcadia. During the so-called Dorian invasion starting about 1000 BC iron-age highlanders (Dorians) from central Greece overran the bronze-age coastal regions of the Peloponnesus, expelling or subjugating the Mycenaean population there, but could not ascend the right-bank mountains to take central Arcadia. The population there maintained its culture (Arcado-Cypriot) and political independence. The Dorians kept the valley, which accounts for the predominance of Doric architecture at Olympia.

== Hydrologic characteristics ==
=== Classification of the Alpheios ===
In their 2003 master plan for the management of Greek water resources, the then Hellenic Ministry of Development, one of the many Greek governmental agencies that have been responsible for the monitoring and care of Greek rivers, noted that of the 765 recorded rivers in Greece, 45 were permanently flowing, of which the Alpheios is one. Although the Greek government had been monitoring some rivers since the 1970s, classification and monitoring of rivers was not mandated by the European Union until the Water Framework Directive (WFD) of 2000. The EU was interested in identifying quality problems with the waters of Europe and rescuing degraded waters. The Hellenic Center for Marine Research (HCMR) therefore added the study of water quality in Greece to its previously existing AQEM program. Select river sites were monitored for three seasons of 2000–2001, spring, summer, and winter, the results appearing in an online report of 2005.

==== Classification by catchment area ====
Several figures have been reported for the catchment area of the Alpheios. A 2004 study by the Civil Engineering Department of the University of Patras reported 3,658 km^{2} (1,412 sq mi), and a 2020 study by a consortium of academic departments including the HCMR reported 3,610 km^{2} (1,390 sq mi). The value 3,810 km^{2} (1,470 sq mi) has been reported by the Greek Ministry of Environment, Energy and Climate Change. A research group of the National Technical University of Athens found the same area, within (but not equal to) the rectangle 38°0′N 21°15′E and 37°20′N 22°20′E. By HCMR standards, this makes the Alpheios a large river (over 1000 km^{2}. basin). The uppermost part of the Alpheios basin, at Karytaina, upstream from its confluence with the Lousios, is 868.6 km^{2} (335.4 sq mi).

The maximum elevation is 2,253 m (7,392 ft) with a mean elevation of 648 m (2,126 ft). The mean slope is about 14 deg. The catchment is about 25% of the 15,511 km^{2} (5,989 sq mi) map area of the Peloponnesus.

The major part of the basin is mountainous, with 52.5% of the catchment map being over 600 m. The rest is hilly (100 - 600 m, 36.9%) and flat along the coast (10.5%). The political distribution is 60% Arcadia, 30% Elis, and 10% Achaea. Arcadia accounts for most of the mountainous and hilly terrain. Achaea shares some of the mountainous terrain to the north, while Elis contains the lowlands and some of the hilly terrain.

==== Classification by zone ====
The 2006 HCMR article defines three river zones of Greece, a "zone" being a region of a similar geophysical terrain, which influences the chemical composition and physical morphology of the rivers in it. Zones 1, 2, and 3, are based on the geologic isopic ("same facies") zones, or tectono-stratigraphic units of Greece, which are ridges of distinct rock trending northwest to southeast. It is theorized that these ridges are their own types of rock because they represent separate microcontinents that migrated across Tethys Sea from Gondwana and docked against Eurasia during the compressional regime of the Hellenic orogeny, a branch of the Alpine orogeny, when parts of the African plate were being pushed against the Eurasian plate and being subducted under it.

The isotopic zones are a product of the Continental drift theory and its modern development, plate tectonics, which prevailed after 1958. The earliest ideas of the Hellenic orogeny are a product of the previous Geosyncline theory, in which the mountains of the Earth were believed to have been raised by compression of large depressions, or geosynclines, caused by shrinkage, and infilled with sediment. It was hypothesized that the mountains of Greece, called the Hellenides, arose from a Hellenic geosyncline in two phases, a volcanic breakthrough in the center, resulting in the "inner Hellenides," and a subsequent orogeny at the west periphery from the wrinkling of sediment running off the central mountains. The peripheral range was the "outer Hellenides." As both theories featured a compressional regime, the Hellenides terminology was kept, but it had to be matched to the isopic zones.

The Alpheios falls within river zone 3, the Outer Hellenides, an arc-like range continuing the Dinarides of the Balkans into western Greece, comprising most of the Peloponnesus, and including the southernmost arc of Aegean islands, with Crete, around to the coast of Anatolia (Hellenic arc). The isopic zones included, west to east, are The Ionian, the Tripolitsa, the Pindos, and the Parnassos. To the east are the inner Hellenides, partly volcanic, with the dividing line down the center of Greece. They end at the Chalcidic Peninsula, beyond which are the Rhodope and Serbomacedonian massifs.

=== River morphology ===
==== The question of the source ====
Mathematical hydrology requires definite numbers: rivers have lengths, cross-sections, measurable linear and volumetric (discharge) rates of flow. The length of a river requires a source. If the Alpheios is a permanently flowing river, then there must be a place of higher elevation where the flow begins, and that is by definition the source. Water comes from a multiplicity of sources. A definite river, however, must have a definite source. The distance along the river from mouth to source is the length.

Lengths, however, like catchments, are not geodetic. They do not take the curvature of the Earth into consideration nor the elevations of the terrain. For example, seen from above, a waterfall is only a few feet of river length, yet the stream may fall hundreds of uncounted feet. Map work for measuring the general morphology of rivers relies on the conformal map, pieced together from satellite photographs and topographic maps.

The length of a river by any system of measurement is not a constant either of measurement or of nature. The measurer working his way along the river encounters many points requiring a decision. For example, the Alpheios divides itself around midstream islands at many points. The river distance through the island zone depends on the stream chosen or the average decided upon. If the river has been impounded or widened by the works of man, the estimator must decide which course through the impoundment applies. The length also depends on the method of estimation. Representation of the river by small straight-line segments depends entirely on the segmentation decisions made. Nature itself does not provide reliable and exact lengths. Rivers change course in history (let alone geologic history) to such a degree that they are typically different from century to century, as the geology of erosion teaches they must be.

The publication sources therefore give riverine lengths and locations that are different from each other, unless one source copies another. The length can be assumed to have been measured at least one or more years before publication, many years if one source relies on another. Some lengths are 110 km (68 mi), 111 km (69 mi), 112 km (70 mi), 113 km (70 mi). Encyclopædia Britannica uses 110 km with a stock phrase "the largest of the Peloponnesus," paraphrased by most of the sources, without definition or evidence. These lengths, representing the general trend, aim at a single location, about 4.2 km (2.6 mi) due south of Megalopoli, where the topographic maps show the beginning of a single stream. Megalopoli is situated on a divide between the Alpheios and its tributary, the Elisson, at about 405 m (1,329 ft). The start of the single stream is at about 380 m (1,250 ft).

The dendritic terrain of the upper Alpheios ascends to central Arcadia by steps. The plateau of Megalopoli is intermediate between the lowlands and the capital of Arcadia, modern Tripoli at 652 m (2,139 ft). Between the two are the Tsemperou and Mainalo mountains, which are well over 1,000 m (3,300 ft). Unsupported speculation throughout the ages wishes to connect the Alpheios of Megalopoli to Tripoli. If the Alpheios is defined as a continuously flowing stream, then it must begin at Megalopoli. Intermittent dendritic streams come from higher, but there is no evidence that they follow any tunnel through the Mainalo Mountains to trickle out as springs at this or that lower location. The main lower locations promulgated by some are Davia, Dorizas, and Asea.

Megalopolis is the only city of a smaller rift valley elliptical in shape trending North-northwest–south-southeast, 18 km (11 mi) long, area 180 km^{2} (69 sq mi), implying an average width of 10 km (6.2 mi). Average altitude is 410 m (1,350 ft). Megalopolis sits on the high point of the central valley, while the Alpheios, sourced in the southeast, skirts the hill to the south, the west, and exits to the NW dropping through a steep and impassible gorge. A former defense against enemies on foot, the gorge is popular for its recreational rafting over rapids, justifying the ancient etymology of "whitewater."

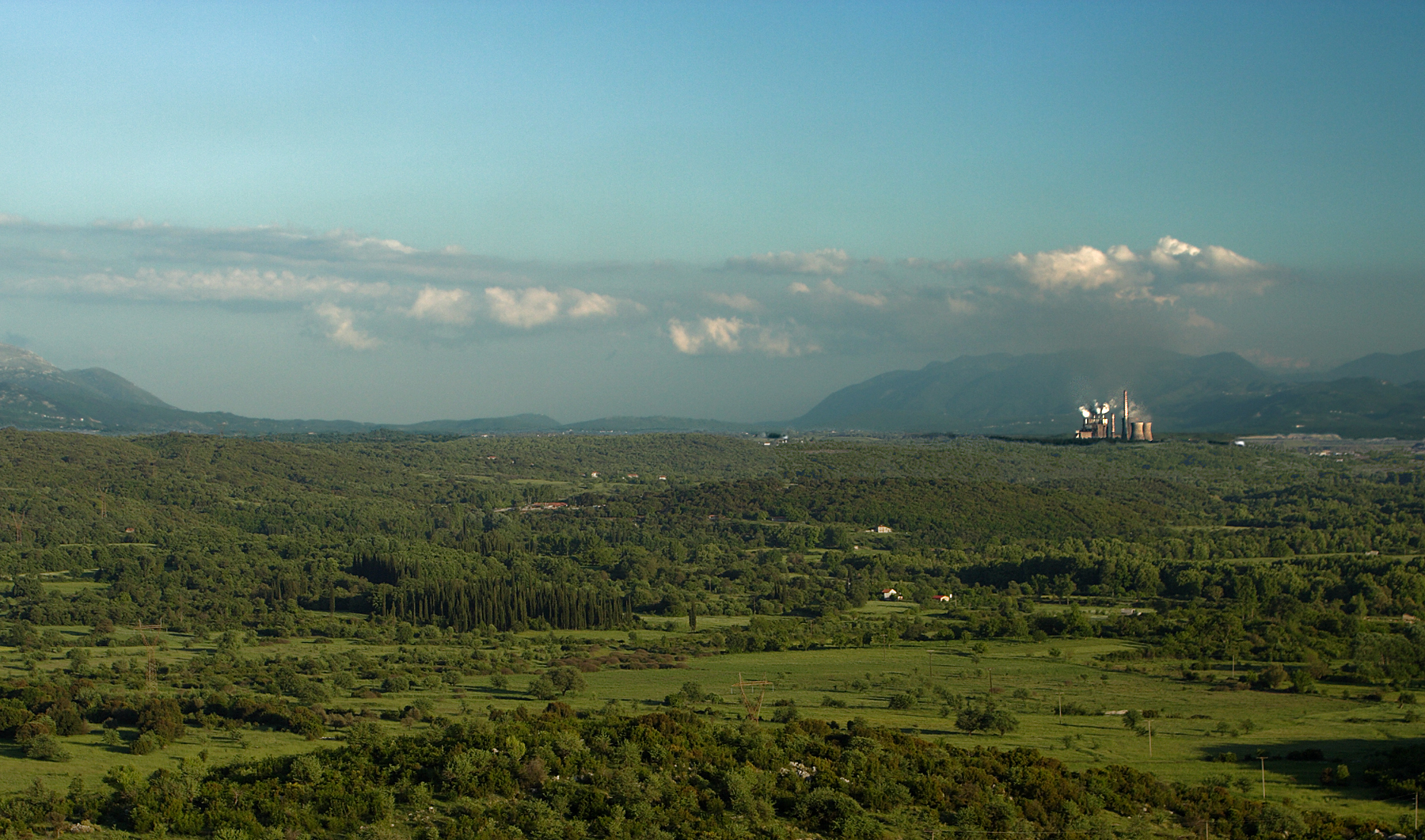
The valley on a good day.

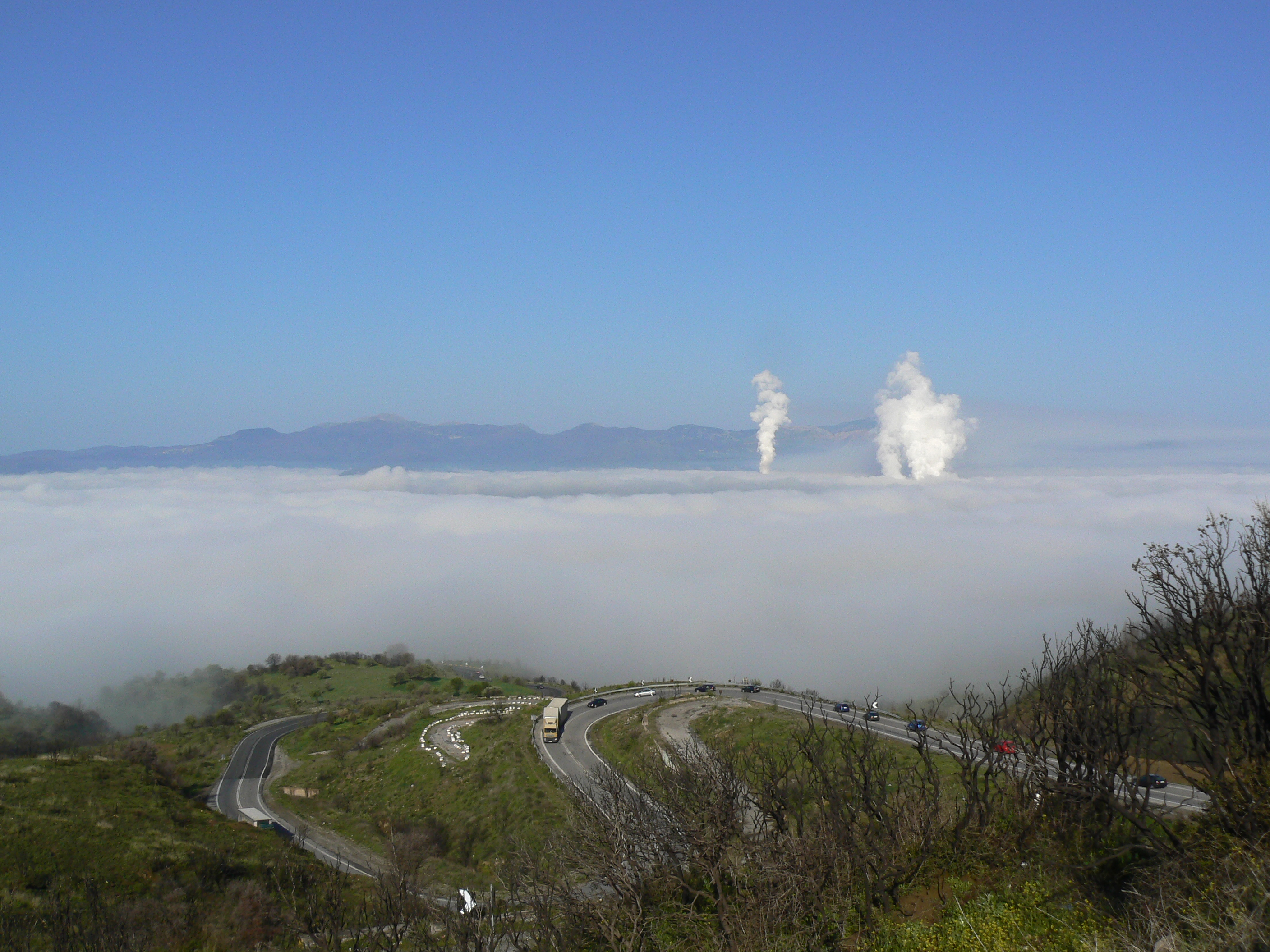
The valley on a bad day.

The uppermost river is blighted by the open-pit mining of lignite. In 1969 the Megalopoli power company opened a lignite-burning facility to the NW of the city on the right bank of the Alpheios, finishing two plants in 1970 and one in 1975. To obtain the lignite, they began strip-mining the region to the west of the city, working the mine southward, then eastward. Stripping essentially removed many meters of the hill. Areas so flattened were then planted with grass. Today the original strip mine is grassy, but the south is open over a rough rectangle 1.3 km (0.81 mi) N–S by 3.4 km (2.1 mi) E–W, or 4.4 km^{2} (1.7 sq mi). Despite the original sanguine engineering reports of how little land would be consumed, which are still being published, the open area is about 2.5% of the total valley area, with no end to expansion in sight. The main pollutants are the gases. White plumes from the plant facilities have become a feature of the Arcadia landscape. During unfavorable meteorological conditions an opaque smog hangs over the valley.

The course of the Alpheios around the mined area is the natural one around the base of the hill. Mining began on the slopes and worked its way down the hill. The river was not diverted or rerouted, as there is no other possible course. Rather, until recently, the river was respected as a border to the mine. Currently the mine has pushed across the river on the SW side of the hill. When the river is full, it occupies parts of the mine, giving it the appearance of a lake on the maps. The lake is, however, only an intermittent puddle.

The source of the river is on the southeast of the mine in the district still called Anthochori ("flowery place"), once a pleasant village, and still advertised as that in the media. It does not exist, except for a few outlying farm buildings. The villagers in 2006 coming under pressure to sell and move away yielded in 2008 after painful negotiations. The village was demolished. The last building down, a church atop a standing column, became the subject of some prize-winning photography internationally.

The single, continuous stream is marked on the current internet topographical maps at 37°21′54″N 22°08′02″E, 380 m (1,250 ft) of elevation. The point falls within a forested morass about 755 m (826 yd) long by 68 m (74 yd) wide, beginning slightly to the west on the north side of a field with a characteristic semicircular north end. The morass is bisected by the old railway to Anthochori. This sink is supplied with water from several intermittent streams forming the apex of a dendritic pattern. They fall into a basin below the 400 m (440 yd) contour lines. The crossing points are marked by V-gullies located 1 to 2 km from the morass: one due south, two west, one NE, and one N from Megalopoli through the mine. These streams are in the small tributary category, some mere thicketed ditches, others with pebble beds and forested banks cutting across the rolling upland. Water levels vary from zero to meandering flows or trickles. They are visible at roads crossing over them; for example, crossing Rt. 7 at 37°21′36″N 22°08′12″E or 37°22′35″N 22°08′53″E.

As to whether this uppermost "tree" of streams is to be considered the Alpheios, no strict definition applies. Local names do not appear on the maps; instead any or all are likely to be labeled Alpheios. The stepped-off length of the river up to the morass, about 101 km (63 mi), does not fit any of the lengths or source locations given by the publications. These lengths must include the continuous stream plus one intermittent stream, the dictum of one source preventing the choice of more than one. Every stream has been proposed by someone.

Flow in the intermittent streams is guided by two tilts of the valley floor: a drop from N to S draining the Mainalo Mountains and a drop from E to W draining Taygetus. The generally preferred candidate for the title of upper Alpheios drops through the 400 m (1,300 ft) elevation line at 37°22′35″N 22°08′53″E as it crosses under Rt. 7 and turns to the SW to enter the morass about 1 km away. From the road the river appears as a deep V-shaped ditch lined densely with trees over which a plank walkway has been placed.

Above the 400 m line the stream drops in a long flow across the base of the Mainalo Mountains from the valley leading up to Tripoli on the high plateau. It generally follows the direction of Rt. E65, the lowland version of Rt. 7, which winds through the mountains. They all start from the same place, Kato Asea. The stream is visible there from the Agorianis-Koronias Road at 37°23′57″N 22°17′06″E. It is still a deep, thicketed ditch cutting through the farmland. The elevation is 652 m (2,139 ft). The drop from there to 400 is innocuous for the 12.52 km (7.78 mi) straight-line distance, approximating the stream fairly well. Over that distance various tributary ditches descend from the mountains, which should not be confused with the main stream.

The 13.52 km to kato Asea does much to fill the gap between the morass and the legacy distances, but there is a further fiction involved. The main village, Asea or ano Asea ("upper Asea" as opposed to "lower Asea") is located at 840 m (2,760 ft), 2.64 km (1.64 mi) up on a severely dendritic ridge from which there is no clear connection to the stream below. In ancient times it must have had its own springs, or it could not have survived, but the streams coming from the mountain are more of a tributary nature. The stream below comes from further up the valley.

The head of the valley is labelled kato Dorizos on some maps. Ano Dorizos like ano Asea is up on a ridge and has no identifiable connection to the streams below, which are in a highly dendritic pattern of dry and wet ditches. The land around Dorizos displays a network of shallow ditches, hardly different from the fields they traverse. Rt. 7 goes over a pass to Tripoli, while Rt. E65 goes under it through tunnels. Long before the tunnel point the dendritic ditches have disappeared into the mountainside. There is nothing like a source in the entire upper valley, but if there were, it is clear that it wouldn't be located in the villages of Asea or Dorizos perched on the mountain ridges. Those names are simply convenient hooks on which to hang a source imagined to be there by offsite geographers looking for a mystic connection to Tripoli.

The failure to find a source in the valley causes some to abandon the upper Alpheios in favor of its tributary, the Elisson, flowing out of the mountains NE of Megalopoli with a much stronger flow. It is more of a mountain stream, as can be seen from the bridge at 37°32′43″N 22°16′30″E. It begins shortly upstream at Falanthos, next to Davia, which is closer to Tripoli than Dorizos. Those who hold this view refer to the Elisson as the Alpheios, as though it were the true upper Alpheios.

==== Stages of the river ====
At Thoknia it receives its right tributary Elissonas, and continues north towards Karytaina. Below Karytaina the Lousios flows into the Alpheios, which continues northwest, passing north of Andritsaina. Near Tripotamia the rivers Ladon and Erymanthos flow into the Alpheios, which then flows west along Olympia and empties into the Ionian Sea south of Pyrgos.

== The Alpheios in antiquity ==
The ancient highway linking Patras and Kalamata ran along this river for most of the length east of Olympia.

== In mythology ==
In Greek mythology, the Peneus and Alpheus were two rivers re-routed by Heracles in his fifth labour in order to clean the filth from the Augean Stables in a single day, a task which had been presumed to be impossible. In the Aeneid, Virgil describes the Alpheus as flowing under the sea to resurface at Ortygia on Sicily, or "so runs the tale".

The nymph Arethusa, who was transformed into a fountain, was called Alpheias because it was believed that her stream had a subterraneous communication with the river Alpheius.

== In literature ==
A poem by Roger Caillois, called Le fleuve Alphée (the Alpheus River), is mainly about this river.

The river disappears several times into the limestone Arcadian mountains and reemerges after flowing some distance underground. This is the origin of the poet Samuel Taylor Coleridge's reference to the river, by the name Alph, in his poem Kubla Khan, although he transferred the location of the river to Kublai Khan's Mongolia, "where Alph, the sacred river, ran".

== Reference bibliography ==
- ELSTAT (2018). "Greece in Figures". Greece in Figures (January–March). This publication by the Hellenic Statistical Authority (ELSTAT) summarizes population, cultural, and geophysical statistics for the various regions of Greece.
- Koglin, Nikola; et al. (2009). "Geochemistry, petrogenesis and tectonic setting of the Samothraki mafic suite, NE Greece: Trace-element, isotopic and zircon age constraints". Tectonophysics. 473 (473): 53–68. Bibcode:2009Tectp.473...53K. doi:10.1016/j.tecto.2008.10.028.
- Manariotis, Ioannis D.; et al. (2004). "Adverse Effects on Alfeios River Basin and an Integrated Management Framework Based on Sustainability" (PDF). Environmental Management. 34 (2): 261–269. doi:10.1007/s00267-004-0069-y. PMID 15559949. S2CID 28253690.
- Sarris, Apostolos; et al. (2009). "Environmental study for pollution in the area of Megalopolis power plant (Peloponnesos, Greece)". Environmental Geology. 58 (8): 1769–1783. Bibcode:2009EnGeo..58.1769S. doi:10.1007/s00254-008-1676-3. S2CID 129089488. This source is a professional study of pollution at Megalopolis due to the coal-burning power plants and open-pit mining.
- Skoulikidis, N.Th.; et al. (2006). "Analysis of factors driving stream water composition and synthesis of management tools—A case study on small/medium Greek catchments" (PDF). Science of the Total Environment. 362 (362): 205–241. Bibcode:2006ScTEn.362..205S. doi:10.1016/j.scitotenv.2005.05.018. PMID 16183103.
- Stefanidis, Konstantinos; et al. (2020). "Nitrogen and Phosphorus Loads in Greek Rivers: Implications for Management in Compliance with the Water Framework Directive". Water. 12 (1531): 1531. doi:10.3390/w12061531.
- Tsangaratos, Paraskevas; et al. (2019). "Spatial Analysis of Extreme Rainfall Values Based on Support Vector Machines Optimized by Genetic Algorithms: The Case of Alfeios Basin, Greece" (PDF). In Pourghasemi, Hamid Reza; Gokceoglu, Candan (eds.). Spatial Modeling in GIS and R for Earth and Environmental Sciences. Amsterdam; Oxford; Cambridge: Elsevier Inc. Archived from the original (PDF) on 2021-06-07. This source publishes mathematical correlations of rainfall in the studied catchment with several geophysical factors.
