= List of settlements in Arcadia =

This is a list of settlements in Arcadia, Greece.

- Aetorrachi
- Agia Sofia
- Agia Varvara
- Agiorgitika
- Agios Andreas
- Agios Georgios
- Agios Ioannis
- Agios Konstantinos
- Agios Petros
- Agios Vasileios, Leonidio
- Agios Vasileios, Tripoli
- Agriakona
- Agridi
- Akovos
- Alea
- Alepochori
- Alonistaina
- Ampelaki
- Anavryto
- Anemodouri
- Ano Doliana
- Ano Karyes
- Anthochori
- Arachamites
- Arachova
- Artemisio
- Asea
- Astros
- Athinaio
- Atsicholos
- Charadros
- Chirades
- Chora
- Choremis
- Chotoussa
- Chranoi
- Chrysochori
- Chrysovitsi
- Dafni
- Dara
- Dimitra
- Dimitsana
- Dorizas
- Doxa
- Drakovouni
- Dyrrachio
- Elaiochori
- Elati
- Elatos
- Elliniko
- Ellinitsa
- Episkopi
- Evandro
- Falaisia
- Garea
- Gefyra
- Giannaioi
- Graikos
- Isaris
- Isoma Karyon
- Kakouraiika
- Kalliani
- Kaltezes
- Kamara
- Kamari
- Kamenitsa
- Kandalos
- Kandila
- Kapsas
- Tou Karatoula
- Karatoulas
- Kardaras
- Kardaritsi
- Karytaina
- Kastanitsa
- Kastanochori
- Kastraki
- Kastri
- Kato Doliana
- Kato Karyes
- Katsimpalis
- Kerasia
- Kerasitsa
- Kerastaris
- Kerpini
- Kokkinorrachi
- Kokkoras
- Kollines
- Komi
- Kontovazaina
- Korakovouni
- Kosmas
- Kotili
- Kounoupia
- Kourounios
- Koutroufa
- Kyparissia
- Langadia
- Lasta
- Lefkochori
- Leonidio
- Leontari
- Leptini
- Levidi
- Limni
- Liodora
- Lithovounia
- Livadaki
- Loukas
- Loutra Iraias
- Lykaio
- Lykochia
- Lykosoura
- Lykouresis
- Lyssarea
- Magoula
- Magouliana
- Mainalo
- Makri
- Makrysi
- Mallota
- Manaris
- Manthyrea
- Marathoussa
- Mari
- Mavria
- Mavriki
- Mavrogiannis
- Megalopoli
- Meligou
- Melissopetra
- Merkovouni
- Mesorrachi
- Monastiraki
- Mygdalia
- Nea Chora
- Nea Ekklisoula
- Neochori Falaisias
- Neochori Lykosouras
- Neochori, Korythio
- Neochori, Tropaia
- Nestani
- Nymfasia
- Ochthia
- Orchomenos
- Oria
- Palaiochori
- Palaiochouni
- Palaiopyrgos
- Palamari
- Pallantio
- Paloumpa
- Panagia
- Panagitsa
- Paparis
- Paradeisia
- Paralio Astros
- Paralongoi
- Partheni
- Pavlia
- Pelagos
- Peleta
- Pera Melana
- Perdikoneri
- Perdikovrysi
- Perivolia
- Perthori
- Petrina
- Piana
- Pigadakia
- Pigadi
- Pikernis
- Plaka
- Platana
- Platanaki
- Platanos
- Potamia
- Poulithra
- Pournaria
- Pragmateftis
- Prasino
- Prastos
- Psari
- Psili Vrysi
- Pyrgaki
- Pyrris
- Raches
- Rados
- Raftis
- Rapsommati
- Rizes
- Rizospilia
- Roeino
- Routsi
- Sanga
- Sapounakaiika
- Sarakini
- Sarakini, Iraia
- Servos
- Silimna
- Simiades
- Sitaina
- Skopi
- Skortsinos
- Soulari
- Souli
- Soulos
- Spatharis
- Stadio
- Stavrodromio
- Stemnitsa
- Steno
- Stolos
- Stringos
- Syrna
- Thanas
- Theoktisto
- Thoknia
- Tourkolekas
- Trilofo
- Tripoli
- Tripotamia
- Tripotamo
- Tropaia
- Tselepakos
- Tsitalia
- Tyros
- Tzivas
- Vachlia
- Valtesiniko
- Valtetsi
- Vangos
- Vastas
- Veligosti
- Velimachi
- Vervena
- Vidiaki
- Vlacherna
- Vlachokerasia
- Vlachorraptis
- Vlisidia
- Vouno
- Vourvoura
- Voutsaras
- Voutsis
- Vytina
- Vyziki
- Xirokarotaina
- Xiropigado
- Zatouna
- Zevgolateio
- Zoni
- Zygovisti

== See also ==
- List of towns and villages in Greece
