= Dafni, Arcadia =

Dafni Δάφνη
- Community
- Location within Greece
- Coordinates: 37°21.5′N 22°16.8′E
- Country: Greece
- Administrative region: Peloponnese
- Regional unit: Arcadia
- Municipality: Tripoli
- Municipal unit: Valtetsi

Population (2021)
  - Community: 48
- Time zone: UTC+2 (EET)
  - Summer (DST): UTC+3 (EEST)
- Vehicle registration: TP

Dafni (Greek: Δάφνη meaning laurel) is a village and a community in the municipal unit of Valtetsi, Arcadia, Greece. The community includes the village Maniatis. Dafni is situated in a plain at the northeastern foot of the Tsemperou mountain. It is 2 km (1 mi) southeast of Paparis, 7 km (4 mi) south of Asea, 14 km (9 mi) southeast of Megalopoli and 19 km (12 mi) southwest of Tripoli.

== Population ==
Year	Settlement population	Community population
1981	-	194
1991	97	-
2001	82	139
2011	48	79
2021	28	48

== See also ==
- List of settlements in Arcadia
