= Routsi =

Routsi Ρούτσι
- Community
- Location within Greece
- Coordinates: 37°21′N 22°11′E
- Country: Greece
- Administrative region: Peloponnese
- Regional unit: Arcadia
- Municipality: Megalopoli
- Municipal unit: Falaisia
- Elevation: 450 m (1,480 ft)

Population (2021)
  - Community: 40
- Time zone: UTC+2 (EET)
  - Summer (DST): UTC+3 (EEST)
- Postal code: 220 21
- Area code: 27910

Routsi (Greek: Ρούτσι) is a village in the northern part of the municipal unit of Falaisia, Arcadia, Greece. It is situated in the wooded hills 8 km southeast of Megalopoli, 3 km northwest of Voutsaras, 3 km southwest of Anemodouri, 4 km south of Rapsommatis, 5 km northeast of Leontari. The railway from Corinth to Kalamata passes south of the village.

== Population ==
Year	Population
1991	69
2001	67
2011	52
2021	40

== See also ==
- List of settlements in Arcadia
