= Agriakona =

Agriakona Αγριακόνα
- Community
- Location within Greece
- Coordinates: 37°19′N 22°17′E
- Country: Greece
- Administrative region: Peloponnese
- Regional unit: Arcadia
- Municipality: Tripoli
- Municipal unit: Valtetsi

Population (2021)
  - Community: 36
- Time zone: UTC+2 (EET)
  - Summer (DST): UTC+3 (EEST)
- Vehicle registration: TP

Agriakona (Greek: Αγριακόνα) is a village in the municipal unit of Valtetsi, Arcadia, Greece. Agriakona is situated in a remote area at the southeastern foot of the Tsemperou mountain, at 660 m elevation. It is 3 km northeast of Skortsinos, 5 km south of Dafni, 7 km northwest of Kollines, 16 km southeast of Megalopoli and 23 km southwest of Tripoli. Agriakona suffered damage from the 2007 Greek forest fires.

== Population ==
Year	Population
1991	66
2001	83
2011	39
2021	36

== See also ==
- List of settlements in Arcadia
