= Vangos =

Vangos Βάγγος
- Community
- Location within Greece
- Coordinates: 37°27.5′N 22°11.7′E
- Country: Greece
- Administrative region: Peloponnese
- Regional unit: Arcadia
- Municipality: Megalopoli
- Municipal unit: Megalopoli

Population (2021)
  - Community: 44
- Time zone: UTC+2 (EET)
  - Summer (DST): UTC+3 (EEST)

Vangos (Greek: Βάγγος) is a village in the municipality of Megalopoli, Arcadia, Greece. It is situated in the southwestern foothills of the Mainalo mountains, at about 800 m elevation. It is 2 km southeast of Karatoulas, 4 km east of Trilofo, 6 km northwest of Kerastaris and 8 km northeast of Megalopoli.

== Population ==
Year	Population
1981	150
1991	144
2001	106
2011	47
2021	44

== See also ==
- List of settlements in Arcadia
