= Makrysi =

Makrysi Μακρύσι
- Community
- Location within Greece
- Coordinates: 37°25′N 22°10′E
- Country: Greece
- Administrative region: Peloponnese
- Regional unit: Arcadia
- Municipality: Megalopoli
- Municipal unit: Megalopoli

Population (2021)
  - Community: 312
- Time zone: UTC+2 (EET)
  - Summer (DST): UTC+3 (EEST)

Makrysi (Greek: Μακρύσι, before 1927: Σιάλεσι - Sialesi) is a village and a community in the municipality of Megalopoli, Arcadia, Greece. It is situated on a hillside on the left bank of the river Elissonas, at 496 m elevation. It is 3 km northwest of Mallota and 3 km northeast of Megalopoli town centre. The community consists of the villages Makrysi and Kato Makrysi. Kato Makrysi is situated at 450 m elevation. Zacharias Barbitsiotis, an anti-Ottoman insurgent defeated the Turks in Sialesi in the 1780s.

== Historical population ==
| Year | Total population | Makrysi | Kato Makrysi |
|---|---|---|---|
| 1981 | - | 153 | - |
| 1991 | 190 | 79 | 111 |
| 2001 | 172 | 53 | 119 |
| 2011 | 265 | 44 | 221 |
| 2021 | 312 | 23 | 289 |

== See also ==
- List of settlements in Arcadia
