= Barea =

Barea may refer to:

- Barea (genus), a concealer moth genus
- Barea (surname), including a list of people with the name
- Barea Soranus, 1st century Roman senator
- Barea or Barya, other names for the Nara language of Eritrea
- The nickname for the Madagascar national football team
