= Dimitris Tsiodras =

Greek politician (born 1959)

Dimitris Tsiodras MEP
- Δημήτρης Τσιόδρας
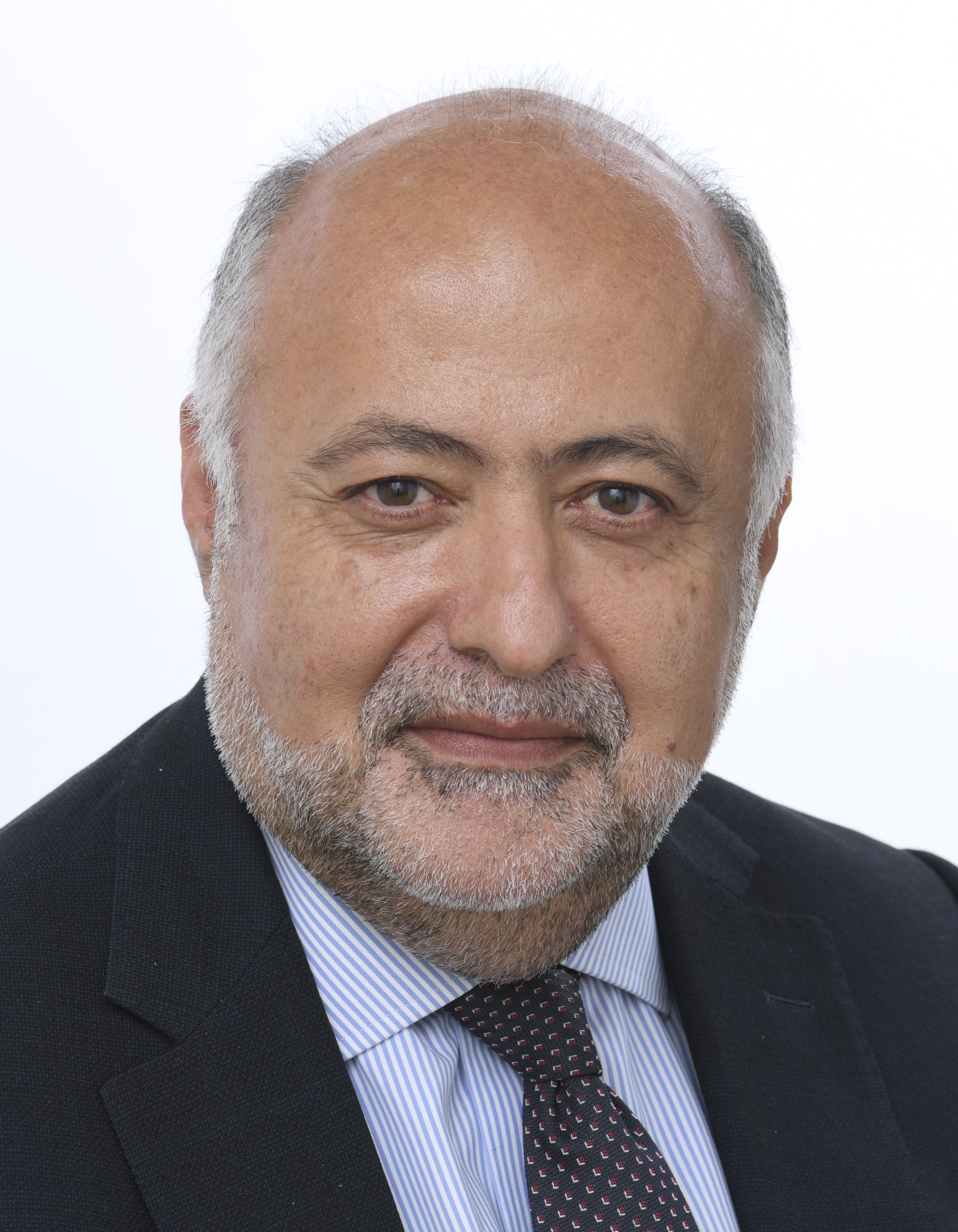
- Dimitris Tsiodras in 2024

Member of the European Parliament
- Incumbent
- Assumed office 16 July 2024
- Constituency: Greece

Personal details
- Born: 26 October 1959 (age 66) Manaris, Greece
- Party: New Democracy
- Occupation: Politician

Dimitris Tsiodras (Greek: Δημήτρης Τσιόδρας; born 26 October 1959 in Samos) is a Greek politician who was elected a Member of the European Parliament (MEP) for New Democracy in the 2024 European Parliament election.

== See also ==
- List of members of the European Parliament (2024–2029)
