= Elaiochori =

Elaiochori (Greek: Ελαιοχώρι meaning "olive town") may refer to several villages in Greece:

- Elaiochori, Achaea, part of the municipal unit of Dymi, Achaea
- Elaiochori, Arcadia, part of the municipal unit of Korythio, Arcadia
- Elaiochori, Kavala, part of the municipal unit of Eleftheres, Kavala regional unit
- Elaiochori, Messenia, a village in the municipality of Kalamata, Messenia
- Elaiochoria, part of the municipal unit of Triglia, Chalkidiki
