= Zevgolateio (disambiguation) =

Zevgolateio (Ζευγολατειό) or Zevgolatio (Ζευγολατιό) may refer to the following places in Greece:

- Zevgolateio, a town in Corinthia
- Zevgolateio, Arcadia, a village in Arcadia
- Zevgolateio, Messenia, a village in the municipal unit Meligalas, Messenia
- Zevgolatio, the former name of Eliki, a village in Achaea
- Zevgolatio, Serres, a village in the municipal unit Strymoniko, Serres regional unit
