= Garea =

Garea is a surname. Notable people with the surname include:

- John Garea (born 1949), New Zealand professional wrestler
- Tony Garea (born 1946), New Zealand professional wrestler, brother of John

It is also a town of ancient Arcadia, Greece:

- Gareatae

and a modern town in Arcadia, Greece:

- Garea

== See also ==
- Barea (surname)
