= Malota =

Malota is an Albanian surname. Notable people with the surname include:

- Pjetër Malota (born 1959), Albanian actor
- Renato Malota (born 1989), Albanian footballer

== See also ==
- Mallota, Greece, a village in Arcadia, Greece
