= Marmaria =

Marmaria (Greek: Μαρμαριά) may refer to several places in Greece:

- Marmaria, Arcadia, a village in the municipal unit of Valtetsi, Arcadia
- Marmaria, Astypalaia, a settlement in the island of Astypalaia, in the Dodecanese
- Marmaria, Drama a village in the municipal unit of Nikiforos, Drama regional unit
