= Kerastaris =

Kerastaris Κεραστάρης
- Community
- Location within Greece
- Coordinates: 37°25′N 22°14′E
- Country: Greece
- Administrative region: Peloponnese
- Regional unit: Arcadia
- Municipality: Tripoli
- Municipal unit: Valtetsi

Population (2021)
  - Community: 35
- Time zone: UTC+2 (EET)
  - Summer (DST): UTC+3 (EEST)
- Vehicle registration: TP

Kerastaris (Greek: Κεραστάρης) is a village in the municipal unit of Valtetsi, Arcadia, Greece. It is situated on a hillside north of the river Alfeios. It is 2 km west of Asea, 2 km north of Athinaio, 9 km east of Megalopoli and 16 km southwest of Tripoli.

== Population ==
Year	Population
1981	100
1991	120
2001	75
2011	39
2021	35

== See also ==
- List of settlements in Arcadia
