= George Perlegos =

Computer scientist and engineer

- Γεώργιος Περλέγκος
- Born: 1950 (age 75–76); Garea, Arcadia, Greece
- Education: San Jose State University (BS); Stanford University (MS)
- Known for: Invention of the N-channel EPROM, EEPROM, founder and CEO of Atmel
- Scientific career
- Fields: Electrical Engineering; Computer Science
- Website: https://www.georgeperlegos.com/

George Perlegos (born 1950) is a Greek-American computer scientist and engineer, best known for pioneering the use of EEPROM and founding Atmel.

== Early life and education ==
Perlegos was born in 1950 to parents Eleni and Pete Perlegos in the village of Garea in Tegea, a region in Arcadia, Greece. Perlegos and his two brothers came to the United States in 1962 and he began working as a grape farmer. He finished high school in Lodi, California, and graduated from San Jose State University in 1972 with a Bachelor of Science in Electrical Engineering. He later completed a Master of Science in Electrical Engineering at Stanford University in 1975, and from 1975 to 1978 attended courses there in pursuit of a PhD.

== Career ==
In 1972, his first job after San Jose State was at American Micro Systems Inc (AMI), then a leading supplier of application specific integrated circuits (ASICs). His first assignment there was to design a single-chip calculator using MOS (Metal Oxide Semiconductor) integrated circuits technology. He simultaneously enrolled in Stanford University to learn more about MOS processing and circuit design. He stayed with AMI through 1974.

=== Intel ===
While attending Stanford, Perlegos interviewed at Intel Corporation. At this time Intel had a new project to develop nonvolatile memory technologies and a new semiconductor chip. After learning about the opportunities to work on these new technologies during the interview, he left AMI for Intel in 1974. While at Intel, he became an expert in semiconductor device physics, circuit design, and semiconductor fabrication processes. His first task, to design and develop an N-channel EPROM different from its predecessor the P-channel EPROM, that would work with the microprocessors Intel was developing at the time. The project known as the 2708, was introduced by Intel in 1975. His invention of the N-channel EPROM was important, as it was the first time a positive voltage and channel injection was used for a nonvolatile memory device, thus requiring significantly lower voltage than its P-channel predecessor. The 2708 was a revolutionary chip, particularly for use with microprocessors. In 1978, Perlegos designed and developed the Intel 2816, an Electrically Erasable PROM (EEPROM) that eliminated the lengthy UV exposure cycle using tunneling to both program and erase the memory.

=== SEEQ Technology ===
Leaving Intel with other Intel employees in 1981, he founded SEEQ Technology. He developed an improved version of EEPROM. that could be programmed and erased on the system board for the first time. The improved version of EEPROM "A 5V-only 16K EEPROM utilizing oxynitride dielectrics" could be programmed and erased on the system board for the first time. It used an on-chip charge pump to generate required programming voltages. It was this ability to program and erase at system levels that allowed EEPROM/FLASH devices to be incorporated in all computers, laptops, cellphones etc

=== ATMEL ===
In 1984, Perlegos founded Atmel corporation and was CEO of Atmel from 1984 to 2006. The firm created many embedded EEPROM and flash memory devices, was a pioneer in NVM, as well as the world's first microcontroller with on-chip flash.

== Honors and awards ==
- 2017 – Flash Memory Summit Lifetime Achievement Award winner "for chip design and fabrication process inventions used in EPROM, EEPROM and Flash Memory devices which have been instrumental in the ubiquity of non-volatile memory."
- 2003 – "Electronics Industry's Movers & Shakers of 2003", Reed Electronics Group.
- 1988 – "30 Who Made a Difference", Electronic Engineering Times.

== Select publications and patents ==
=== Publications ===
- W. Ip, Te-Long Chiu, Tsung-Ching Wu and G. Perlegos, "256Kb CMNOS EPROM," 1984 IEEE International Solid-State Circuits Conference. Digest of Technical Papers, San Francisco, CA, USA, 1984, pp. 138–139, doi: 10.1109/ISSCC.1984.1156664.
- A. Gupta, Te-Long Chiu, M. Chang, A. Renninger and G. Perlegos, "A 5V-only 16K EEPROM utilizing oxynitride dielectrics and EPROM redundancy," 1982 IEEE International Solid-State Circuits Conference. Digest of Technical Papers, San Francisco, CA, USA, 1982, pp. 184–185, doi: 10.1109/ISSCC.1982.1156369.
- S. Mehrotra, Tsung-Ching Wu, Te-Long Chiu and G. Perlegos, "A 64Kb CMOS EEROM with on-chip ECC," 1984 IEEE International Solid-State Circuits Conference. Digest of Technical Papers, San Francisco, CA, USA, 1984, pp. 142–143, doi:10.1109/ISSCC.1984.1156662.

=== Patents ===
- US Patent for Electrically programmable and electrically erasable MOS memory device Patent (Patent # 4,558,344)
- US Patent for Method of making EPROM cell with reduced programming voltage Patent (Patent # 4,519,849)
- US Patent for Erasable programmable read-only memory Patent (Patent # 3,938,108)
