= Prasino, Arcadia =

Prasino Πράσινο
- Community
- Location within Greece
- Coordinates: 37°47′N 22°9.5′E
- Country: Greece
- Administrative region: Peloponnese
- Regional unit: Arcadia
- Municipality: Gortynia
- Municipal unit: Kleitor

Population (2021)
  - Community: 104
- Time zone: UTC+2 (EET)
  - Summer (DST): UTC+3 (EEST)
- Vehicle registration: TP

Prasino (Greek: Πράσινο meaning "green", before 1927: Καρνέσι – Karnesi) is a mountain village and a community in the municipal unit of Kleitor, Arcadia, Greece. The community includes the small village Kalyvia Karnesi. Prasino is situated on a mountain slope, at 820 m elevation. It is 4 km east of Drakovouni, 5 km southwest of Dara and 36 km northwest of Tripoli.

== Population ==
Year	Population village	Population community
1981	501	–
1991	495	–
2001	352	369
2011	189	197
2021	-	104

== Culture ==
The Laographic Museum of Prasino exhibits traditional local artifacts and folklore items.

== See also ==
- List of settlements in Arcadia
