= Anemodouri =

Anemodouri Ανεμοδούρι
- Community
- Location within Greece
- Coordinates: 37°21.6′N 22°13′E
- Country: Greece
- Administrative region: Peloponnese
- Regional unit: Arcadia
- Municipality: Megalopoli
- Municipal unit: Falaisia
- Elevation: 700 m (2,300 ft)

Population (2021)
  - Community: 48
- Time zone: UTC+2 (EET)
  - Summer (DST): UTC+3 (EEST)
- Postal code: 220 21
- Area code: 27910

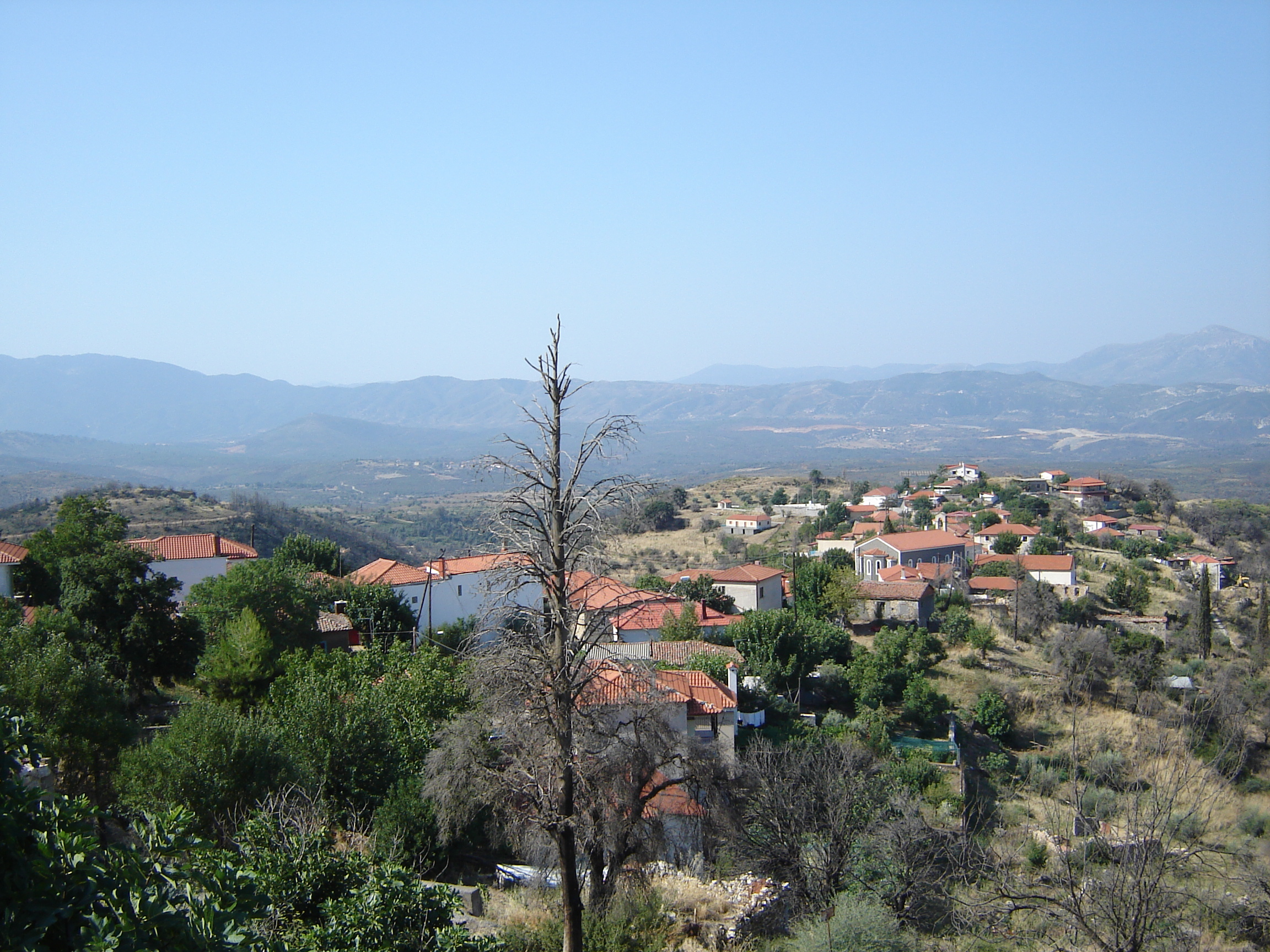
Anemodouri

Anemodouri (Greek: Ανεμοδούρι) is a village in the municipal unit Falaisia, southwestern Arcadia, Greece. It is located on the northwestern slopes of mount Tsemperou. It is 3 km northwest of Anavryto, 3 km southeast of Rapsommatis, 4 km west of Paparis and 9 km southeast of Megalopoli.

== Population ==
Year	Population
1991	130
2001	133
2011	68
2021	48

== See also ==
- List of settlements in Arcadia
