= Rapsommati =

Rapsommati Ραψομμάτη
- Community
- Location within Greece
- Coordinates: 37°23′N 22°11.6′E
- Country: Greece
- Administrative region: Peloponnese
- Regional unit: Arcadia
- Municipality: Megalopoli
- Municipal unit: Megalopoli
- Elevation: 560 m (1,840 ft)

Population (2021)
  - Community: 34
- Time zone: UTC+2 (EET)
  - Summer (DST): UTC+3 (EEST)
- Postal code: 222 00
- Area code: 27910

Rapsommati (Greek: Ραψομμάτη, also Ραψομμάτης – Rapsommatis) is a village within the municipality of Megalopoli in the western part of Arcadia, Greece. It is situated on a hill, 1 km southeast of Mallota, 2 km southwest of Palaiochouni, 3 km northwest of Anemodouri and 5 km southeast of Megalopoli. The A7 motorway (Corinth–Tripoli–Kalamata) passes north of the village, through the Rapsommati Tunnel.

== Historical population ==
Year	Population
1981	129
1991	155
2001	97
2011	55
2021	34

== See also ==
- List of settlements in Arcadia
