= Nea Ekklisoula =

Nea Ekklisoula Νέα Εκκλησούλα
- Community
- Location within Greece
- Coordinates: 37°26′N 22°8′E
- Country: Greece
- Administrative region: Peloponnese
- Regional unit: Arcadia
- Municipality: Megalopoli
- Municipal unit: Megalopoli

Population (2021)
  - Community: 37
- Time zone: UTC+2 (EET)
  - Summer (DST): UTC+3 (EEST)

Nea Ekklisoula (Greek: Νέα Εκκλησούλα meaning "new church") is a village in the municipality of Megalopoli, Arcadia, Greece. It is situated near the southwestern foothills of the Mainalo mountains, at about 450 m elevation. It is 2 km southwest of Trilofo, 2 km east of Soulos and 4 km north of Megalopoli town centre.

== Population ==
Year	Population
1981	122
1991	89
2001	73
2011	39
2021	37

== See also ==
- List of settlements in Arcadia
