= Trilofo, Arcadia =

Trilofo Τρίλοφο
- Community
- Location within Greece
- Coordinates: 37°27′N 22°9′E
- Country: Greece
- Administrative region: Peloponnese
- Regional unit: Arcadia
- Municipality: Megalopoli
- Municipal unit: Megalopoli

Population (2021)
  - Community: 37
- Time zone: UTC+2 (EET)
  - Summer (DST): UTC+3 (EEST)

Trilofo (Greek: Τρίλοφο meaning "three hills") is a village and a community in the municipality of Megalopoli, Arcadia, Greece. It is situated in the southwestern foothills of the Mainalo mountains, at about 550 m elevation. It is 2 km northeast of Nea Ekklisoula, 3 km southeast of Zoni, 3 km southwest of Karatoulas and 6 km north of Megalopoli. The community includes the village Palaiomoiri.

== Population ==
Year	Village population	Community population
1981	133	-
1991	70	-
2001	57	71
2011	35	53
2021	23	37

== See also ==
- List of settlements in Arcadia
