= Paparis =

Paparis Πάπαρης
- Community
- Location within Greece
- Coordinates: 37°21′N 22°15′E
- Country: Greece
- Administrative region: Peloponnese
- Regional unit: Arcadia
- Municipality: Tripoli
- Municipal unit: Valtetsi
- Elevation: 670 m (2,200 ft)

Population (2021)
  - Community: 88
- Time zone: UTC+2 (EET)
  - Summer (DST): UTC+3 (EEST)
- Postal code: 220 26
- Vehicle registration: TP

Paparis (Greek: Πάπαρης) is a village in the municipal unit of Valtetsi, Arcadia, Greece. It is situated on the northern slope of the mountain Tsemperou, at 670 m elevation. It is 4 km south of Athinaio, 4 km east of Anemodouri, 12 km southeast of Megalopoli and 19 km southwest of Tripoli.

== Population ==
Year	Population
1981	261
1991	232
2001	129
2011	105
2021	88

== See also ==
- List of settlements in Arcadia
