= Drakovouni =

Drakovouni Δρακοβούνι,Γλόγοβα
- Settlement
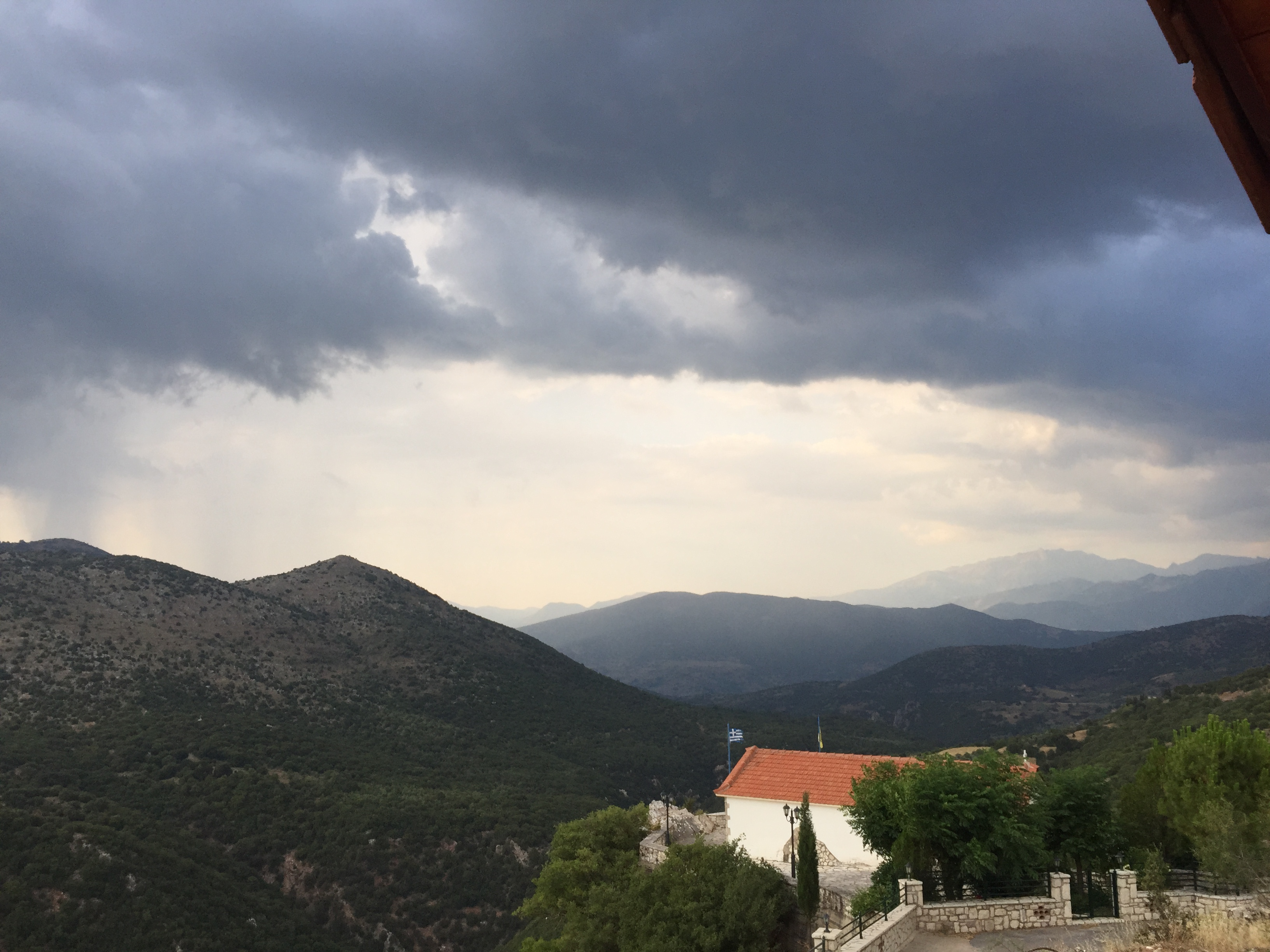

- Location within Greece
- Coordinates: 37°46.5′N 22°07′E
- Country: Greece
- Administrative region: Peloponnese
- Regional unit: Arcadia
- Municipality: Gortynia
- Municipal unit: Kleitor
- Elevation: 781 m (2,562 ft)

Population (2021)
  - Community: 50
- Time zone: UTC+2 (EET)
  - Summer (DST): UTC+3 (EEST)
- Postal code: 220 02
- Area code: 27950
- Vehicle registration: TP

Drakovouni (Greek: Δρακοβούνι, before 1927: Γλόγοβα - Glogova), Arcadia, Greece is a remote village in the municipality of Gortynia, Arcadia, Peloponnese, Greece. It is situated at 780 m elevation, on the slope of a mountain also called Drakovouni, 1,077 m elevation. It is 4 km west of Prasino, 9 km south of Filia and 37 km northwest of Tripoli. The few year-round residents are involved in agriculture. The village is known for the victorious battle of the guerrillas against the Nazis on April 20, 1944. Drakovouni has an elementary school, four churches, and three monasteries.

== Historical population ==
Year	Population
1981	250
1991	120
2001	178
2011	66
2021	50

== See also ==
- List of settlements in Arcadia
