= Lykochia =

Lykochia Λυκόχια
- Community
- Location within Greece
- Coordinates: 37°30′N 22°10′E
- Country: Greece
- Administrative region: Peloponnese
- Regional unit: Arcadia
- Municipality: Megalopoli
- Municipal unit: Megalopoli

Population (2021)
  - Community: 42
- Time zone: UTC+2 (EET)
  - Summer (DST): UTC+3 (EEST)

Lykochia (Greek: Λυκόχια) is a village in the municipality of Megalopoli, Arcadia, Greece. It is situated in the southwestern foothills of the Mainalo mountains. It is 2 km northeast of Pavlia, 3 km northwest of Karatoulas, 7 km southwest of Chrysovitsi and 11 km north of Megalopoli.

== Population ==
Year	Population
1981	201
1991	157
2001	146
2011	121
2021	42

== See also ==
- List of settlements in Arcadia
