= Valtetsi =

Valtetsi Βαλτέτσι
- Municipal unit
- Location within the regional unit

- Location within Greece
- Coordinates: 37°29′N 22°17′E
- Country: Greece
- Administrative region: Peloponnese
- Regional unit: Arcadia
- Municipality: Tripoli

Area
  - Municipal unit: 210.2 km^{2} (81.2 sq mi)

Population (2021)
  - Municipal unit: 816
  - Municipal unit density: 3.88/km^{2} (10.1/sq mi)
- Time zone: UTC+2 (EET)
  - Summer (DST): UTC+3 (EEST)
- Vehicle registration: TP

Valtetsi (Greek: Βαλτέτσι) is a former municipality in Arcadia, Peloponnese, Greece. Since the 2011 local government reform it is part of the municipality Tripoli, of which it is a municipal unit. The municipal unit has an area of 210.243 km^{2}. The seat of the municipality was in Asea. Valtetsi is located in the highlands southwest of Tripoli and northeast of Megalopoli.

== Subdivisions ==
The municipal unit Valtetsi is subdivided into the following communities (constituent villages in brackets):

- Agriakona
- Ampelaki (Ampelaki, Lianos)
- Arachamites
- Asea (Asea, Kato Asea)
- Athinaio (Athinaio, Marmaria)
- Dafni (Dafni, Maniatis)
- Dorizas
- Kaltezes (Kaltezes, Kouvelia)
- Kerastaris
- Manaris
- Mavrogiannis
- Palaiochouni
- Paparis
- Valtetsi

== Population ==
Year	Municipal unit population
1991	2,222
2001	1,842
2011	917
2021	816
