= Pournaria =

Pournaria Πουρναριά
- Community
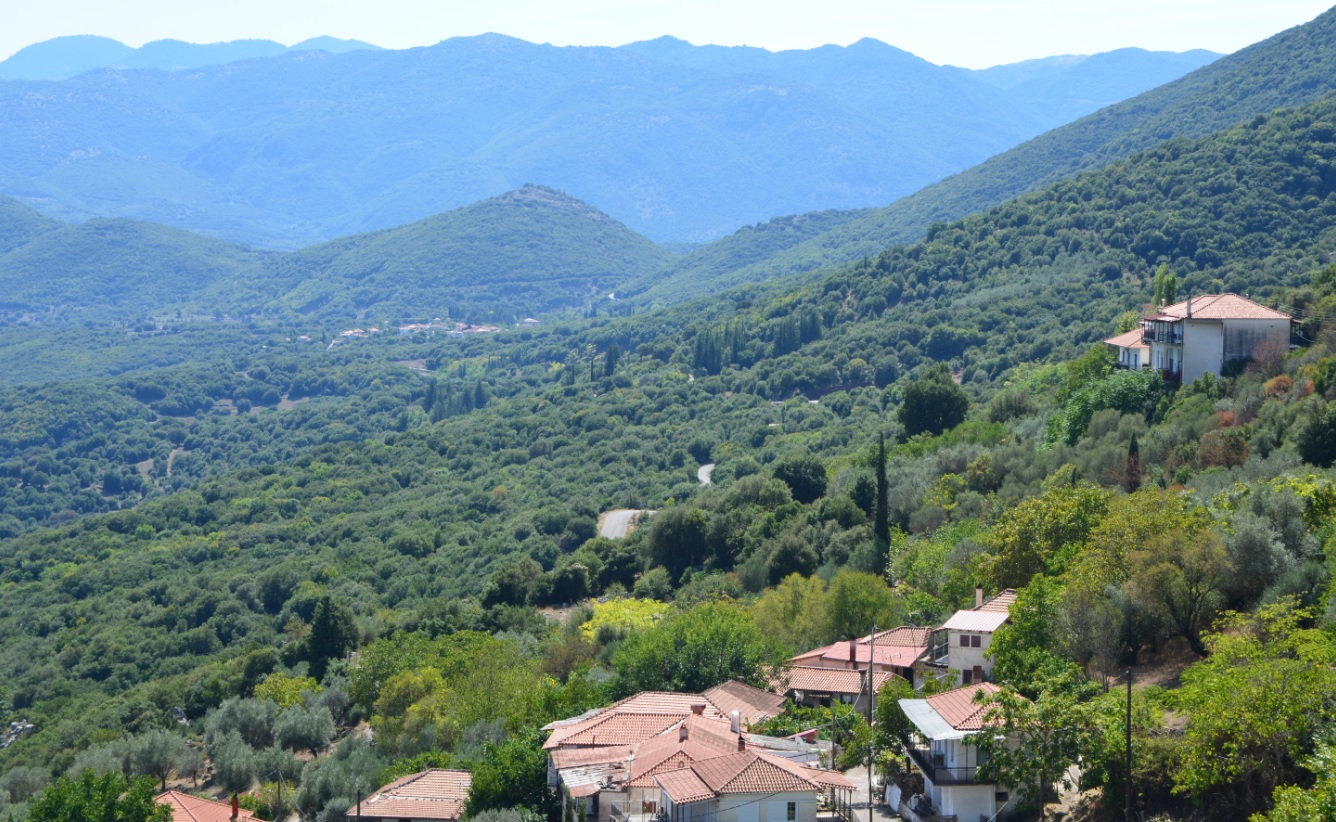
- The village of Pournaria, Arkadia, can be seen in the background. View from the village of Dafni

- Location within Greece
- Coordinates: 37°47′N 22°02′E
- Country: Greece
- Administrative region: Peloponnese
- Regional unit: Arcadia
- Municipality: Gortynia
- Municipal unit: Kleitor

Population (2021)
  - Community: 93
- Time zone: UTC+2 (EET)
  - Summer (DST): UTC+3 (EEST)
- Vehicle registration: TP

Pournaria (Greek: Πουρναριά) is a village and a community in the municipal unit of Kleitor, Arcadia, Greece. In 2021, it had a population of 93. The community includes the village Mouria. Pournaria is situated on a hillside, at 500 m elevation. Mouria is 3 km to the southwest of Pournaria, on the northern shore of the Ladon reservoir. Pournaria is 9 km northeast of Tropaia, 10 km southeast of Paos and 42 km northwest of Tripoli.

== See also ==
- List of settlements in Arcadia
