= Anavryto =

Anavryto Αναβρυτό
- Community
- Location within Greece
- Coordinates: 37°20.5′N 22°14′E
- Country: Greece
- Administrative region: Peloponnese
- Regional unit: Arcadia
- Municipality: Megalopoli
- Municipal unit: Falaisia
- Elevation: 670 m (2,200 ft)

Population (2021)
  - Community: 42
- Time zone: UTC+2 (EET)
  - Summer (DST): UTC+3 (EEST)
- Postal code: 220 21
- Area code: 27910

Anavryto (Greek: Αναβρυτό, before 1927: Γαρδίκι - Gardiki) is a mountain village and a community in the municipal unit Falaisia, Arcadia, Greece. The community consists of the villages Anavryto and Kato Anavryto, 1 km south of Anavryto. Both villages are on the southwestern slope of mount Tsemperou. Anavryto is 3 km southeast of Anemodouri, 3 km northeast of Voutsaras and 11 km southeast of Megalopoli. The village has a school and a church named Agia Marina. Anavryto suffered damage from the 2007 Greek forest fires.

== Population ==
Year	Total population	Anavryto Population	Kato Anavryto Population
1920	469	-	-
1961	186	-	-
1991	116	83	33
2001	96	60	36
2011	83	52	31
2021	42	21	21

== See also ==
- List of settlements in Arcadia
