= Kleitor =

Kleitor Κλείτωρ
- Municipal unit
- Location within the regional unit

- Location within Greece
- Coordinates: 37°45′N 22°05′E
- Country: Greece
- Administrative region: Peloponnese
- Regional unit: Arcadia
- Municipality: Gortynia

Area
  - Municipal unit: 150.6 km^{2} (58.1 sq mi)

Population (2021)
  - Municipal unit: 920
  - Municipal unit density: 6.1/km^{2} (16/sq mi)
- Time zone: UTC+2 (EET)
  - Summer (DST): UTC+3 (EEST)
- Vehicle registration: TP

Kleitor or Cleitor (Greek: Κλείτωρ) is a former municipality in Arcadia, Peloponnese, Greece. Since the 2011 local government reform it is part of the municipality Gortynia, of which it is a municipal unit. The municipal unit has an area of 150.582 km^{2}. The seat of the municipality was in Mygdalia.

== History ==
Cleitor was a historic and powerful city-state in ancient Greece.

== Subdivisions ==
The municipal unit Kleitor is subdivided into the following communities (constituent villages in brackets):

- Agridi
- Drakovouni
- Kerpini (Kerpini, Ano Kalyvia, Kato Kalyvia)
- Mygdalia (Mygdalia, Palaiopyrgos)
- Pournaria (Pournaria, Mouria)
- Prasino (Prasino, Kalyvia Karnesi)
- Theoktisto
- Valtesiniko (Valtesiniko, Kourouveli, Olomades)
- Xirokarotaina

== Population ==
| Year | Population |
|---|---|
| 1991 | 2,761 |
| 2001 | 2,584 |
| 2011 | 1,406 |
| 2021 | 920 |
