= Pelagos =

Pelagos Πέλαγος
- Community
- Location within Greece
- Coordinates: 37°31′N 22°25′E
- Country: Greece
- Administrative region: Peloponnese
- Regional unit: Arcadia
- Municipality: Tripoli
- Municipal unit: Tripoli

Population (2021)
  - Community: 114
- Time zone: UTC+2 (EET)
  - Summer (DST): UTC+3 (EEST)

Pelagos (Greek: Πέλαγος) is a village in the municipality of Tripoli, Arcadia, Greece. It is situated in the plain of Tripoli, at 670 m above sea level. As of 2011, it had a population of 151. It is 2 km northwest of Zevgolateio and 4 km northeast of Tripoli city centre. The A7 motorway (Corinth–Tripoli–Kalamata) passes west of the village. The name Pelagos (meaning "sea") dates from classical antiquity, referring to an oak forest on the road from Mantineia to Tegea.

== Population ==
Year	Population
1981	134
1991	148
2001	115
2011	151
2021	114

== See also ==
- List of settlements in Arcadia
