= Korythio =

Korythio Κορύθιο
- Municipal unit
- Location within the regional unit

- Location within Greece
- Coordinates: 37°30′N 22°28′E
- Country: Greece
- Administrative region: Peloponnese
- Regional unit: Arcadia
- Municipality: Tripoli

Area
  - Municipal unit: 115.2 km^{2} (44.5 sq mi)

Population (2021)
  - Municipal unit: 1,583
  - Municipal unit density: 13.74/km^{2} (35.59/sq mi)
- Time zone: UTC+2 (EET)
  - Summer (DST): UTC+3 (EEST)
- Vehicle registration: TP

Korythio (Greek: Κορύθιο) is a former municipality in Arcadia, Peloponnese, Greece. Since the 2011 local government reform it is part of the municipality Tripoli, of which it is a municipal unit. The municipal unit has an area of 115.182 km^{2}. Population 1,583 (2021). The seat of the municipality was in Steno. Other villages in the municipal unit are Agiorgitika, Elaiochori, Neochori, Partheni, and Zevgolateio.
