= Palaiochouni =

Palaiochouni Παλαιοχούνη
- Community
- Location within Greece
- Coordinates: 37°24′N 22°12′E
- Country: Greece
- Administrative region: Peloponnese
- Regional unit: Arcadia
- Municipality: Tripoli
- Municipal unit: Valtetsi

Population (2021)
  - Community: 16
- Time zone: UTC+2 (EET)
  - Summer (DST): UTC+3 (EEST)
- Vehicle registration: TP

Palaiochouni (Greek: Παλαιοχούνη) is a village in the municipal unit Valtetsi, Arcadia, Greece. It is situated in the hills on the eastern end of the plain of Megalopoli, at 700 m elevation. It is 2 km east of Mallota, 3 km west of Athinaio, 7 km east of Megalopoli and 19 km southwest of Tripoli. The Greek National Road 7 (Kalamata - Megalopoli - Tripoli) passes through the village.

== Population ==
Year	Population
1981	85
1991	41
2001	42
2011	24
2021	16

== See also ==
- List of settlements in Arcadia
