= Manaris =

Human settlement in Greece

Manaris Μάναρης
- Community
- Location within Greece
- Coordinates: 37°24′N 22°19′E
- Country: Greece
- Administrative region: Peloponnese
- Regional unit: Arcadia
- Municipality: Tripoli
- Municipal unit: Valtetsi

Population (2021)
  - Community: 43
- Time zone: UTC+2 (EET)
  - Summer (DST): UTC+3 (EEST)

Manaris (Greek: Μάναρης) is a village in Arcadia, Greece. It is part of the municipal unit Valtetsi and has 43 permanent residents (2021). It is situated at the southeastern end of the plain of Asea.
