= Garea (Arcadia) =

Garea Γαρέα
- Community
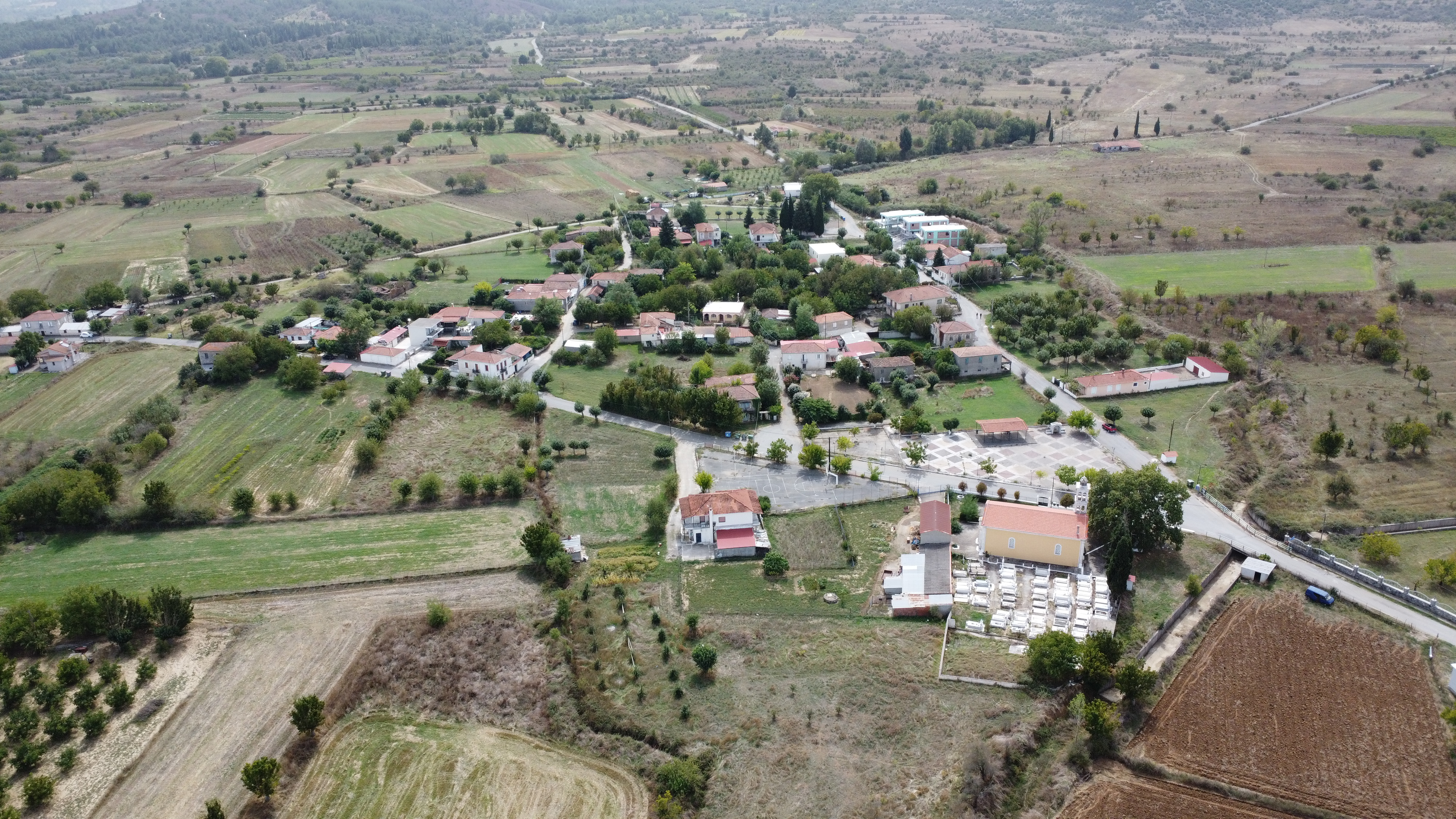

- Location within Greece
- Coordinates: 37°26′N 22°26′E
- Country: Greece
- Administrative region: Peloponnese
- Regional unit: Arcadia
- Municipality: Tripoli
- Municipal unit: Tegea
- Elevation: 670 m (2,200 ft)

Population (2021)
  - Community: 57
- Time zone: UTC+2 (EET)
  - Summer (DST): UTC+3 (EEST)
- Postal code: 220 12
- Area code: 271
- Vehicle registration: TP

Garea (Greek: Γαρέα) is a village in the municipal unit of Tegea in Arcadia, Greece. Its population was 57 in 2021. Its primary economic activity isagriculture.

== Notable individuals ==
- George Perlegos (1950-), Greek-American computer scientist and engineer, best known for pioneering the use of EEPROM and founding Atmel
