= Barea (surname) =

Barea is a Basque surname. Notable people with the surname include:

- Ainize Barea Nuñez (born 1992), Spanish footballer
- Arturo Barea (1897–1957), Spanish journalist, broadcaster and writer
- Ilse Barea-Kulcsar (1902–1973), Austrian journalist, translator, writer and communist activist
- Juan Barea (born 1931), Argentine basketball player
- José Juan Barea (born 1984), Puerto Rican basketball player
- María Carmen Barea (born 1966), Spanish field hockey player
