= Zevgolateio, Arcadia =

Zevgolateio Ζευγολατείο
- Settlement
- Location within Greece
- Coordinates: 37°31.1′N 22°26.5′E
- Country: Greece
- Administrative region: Peloponnese
- Regional unit: Arcadia
- Municipality: Tripoli
- Municipal unit: Korythio

Population (2021)
  - Community: 302
- Time zone: UTC+2 (EET)
  - Summer (DST): UTC+3 (EEST)
- Vehicle registration: TP

Zevgolateio (Greek: Ζευγολατείο) is a village and a community in the municipal unit of Korythio, Arcadia, Greece. The community includes the small village Parori. It is situated at the eastern edge of the plain of Tripoli, at about 650 m elevation. Zevgolateio is 2 km southeast of Pelagos, 3 km northwest of Steno and 6 km east of Tripoli.

== Population ==
Year	Population village	Population community
1981	-	457
1991	355	411
2001	328	365
2011	389	464
2021	256	302

== See also ==
- List of settlements in Arcadia
