= Karatoulas =

Karatoulas Καράτουλας
- Community
- Location within Greece
- Coordinates: 37°28.2′N 22°10.6′E
- Country: Greece
- Administrative region: Peloponnese
- Regional unit: Arcadia
- Municipality: Megalopoli
- Municipal unit: Megalopoli
- Elevation: 700 m (2,300 ft)

Population (2021)
  - Community: 21
- Time zone: UTC+2 (EET)
  - Summer (DST): UTC+3 (EEST)

Karatoulas (Greek: Καράτουλας) is a village in the municipality of Megalopoli, Arcadia, Greece. It is situated on a hillside in the southwestern foothills of the Mainalo mountains, at about 750 m elevation. It is 2 km northwest of Vangos, 3 km southeast of Lykochia and 9 km northeast of Megalopoli.

== Population ==
Year	Population
1981	107
1991	78
2001	82
2011	28
2021	21

== See also ==
- List of settlements in Arcadia
