= Juan Barea =

Argentine former basketball player (1931–2004)

Personal information
- Born: 15 March 1931
- Died: 4 April 2012 (aged 81)
Medals
Men's basketball
Representing Argentina
Pan American Games
Silver medal – second place	1955 Mexico City	Team

Juan Alberto Barea Gamboa (Note: In this Spanish name, the first or paternal surname is Barea and the second or maternal family name is Gamboa.) (15 March 1931– 4 April 2012) was an Argentine basketball player.

Gamboa died on 4 April 2012, at the age of 81.
