= Mallota, Greece =

Village in Arcadia, Greece

Mallota Μαλλωτά
- Community
- Location within Greece
- Coordinates: 37°23.6′N 22°11.1′E
- Country: Greece
- Administrative region: Peloponnese
- Regional unit: Arcadia
- Municipality: Megalopoli
- Municipal unit: Megalopoli

Population (2021)
  - Community: 42
- Time zone: UTC+2 (EET)
  - Summer (DST): UTC+3 (EEST)

Mallota (Greek: Μαλλωτά) is a village in the municipality of Megalopoli, Arcadia, Greece. It is situated on a hillside, 1 km northeast of Rapsommati, 2 km west of Palaiochouni and 5 km east of Megalopoli. The A7 motorway (Corinth–Tripoli–Kalamata) passes south of the village.

== Population ==
Year	Population
1981	111
1991	80
2001	73
2011	46
2021	42

== See also ==
- List of settlements in Arcadia
