= Elaiochori, Arcadia =

Elaiochori Ελαιοχώρι
- Community
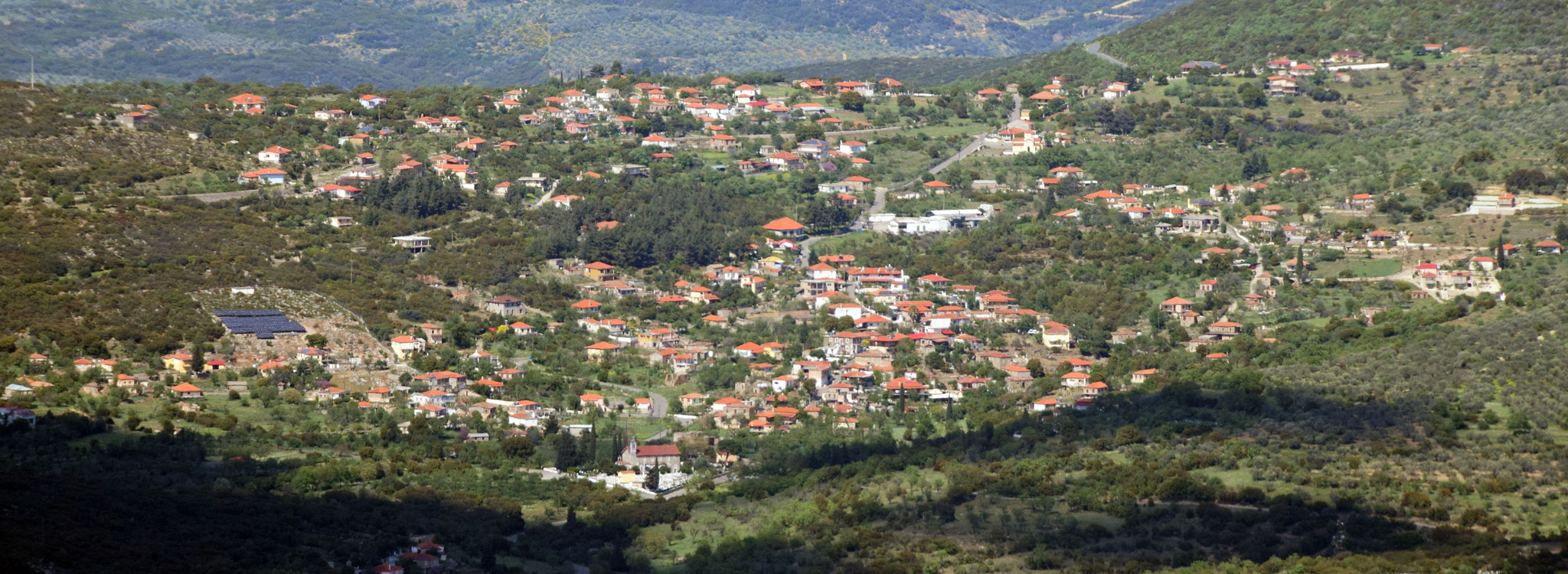
- Panoramic view, April 2017

- Location within Greece
- Coordinates: 37°27′15″N 22°34′04″E
- Country: Greece
- Administrative region: Peloponnese
- Regional unit: Arcadia
- Municipality: Tripoli
- Municipal unit: Korythio

Population (2021)
  - Community: 309
- Time zone: UTC+2 (EET)
  - Summer (DST): UTC+3 (EEST)

Elaiochori (Greek: Ελαιοχώρι [eleoˈxori]) is a mountain village in Arcadia, Greece. It lies near the border of Argolis. It was historically called Masklina (Greek: Μάσκλινα [ˈmasklina]), a Slavic name meaning "olives." The Korinth-Kalamata railway runs through the village. Elaiochori has a population of 309 (2021 census) and is part of the municipal unit of Korythio. Its name comes from its considerable production of olives and olive oil.

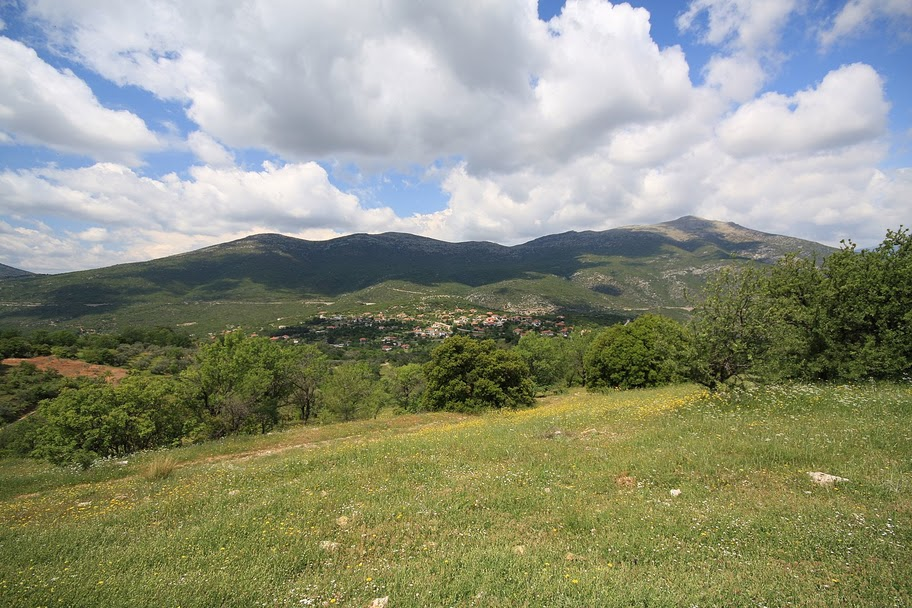
Spring 2008
