= Tsemperou =

Mountain in Greece

- Τσεμπερού
- Location within Greece

Highest point
- Elevation: 1,254 m (4,114 ft)
- Coordinates: 37°20′53″N 22°14′53″E

Geography
- Location: southern Arcadia, Greece

The Tsemperou (Greek: Τσεμπερού) is a mountain located in southern Arcadia, central Peloponnese, Greece. The elevation of its summit is 1,254 m. It is situated southeast of the plain of Megalopoli, 12 km from the town centre. Villages on the Tsemperou include Anavryto and Paparis. The river Alfeios flows north of the mountain.
