= Athinaio =

Athinaio Αθήναιο
- Community
- Location within Greece
- Coordinates: 37°24′N 22°15′E
- Country: Greece
- Administrative region: Peloponnese
- Regional unit: Arcadia
- Municipality: Tripoli
- Municipal unit: Valtetsi

Population (2021)
  - Community: 95
- Time zone: UTC+2 (EET)
  - Summer (DST): UTC+3 (EEST)
- Vehicle registration: TP

Athinaio (Greek: Αθήναιο; before 1928 Αλήκα, Alika) is a village and a community in the municipal unit of Valtetsi, Tripoli, Arcadia, Greece. It is situated on a hillside, north of the river Alfeios. The community includes the village Marmaria. Athinaio is 2 km southwest of Asea, 10 km east of Megalopoli and 16 km southwest of Tripoli. The A7 motorway (Corinth–Tripoli–Kalamata) passes south of the village.

== Population ==
Year	Settlement population	Population community
1981	294	-
1991	229	-
2001	149	183
2011	82	95
2021	85	95

== Notable people ==
- Kostas Triantafyllopoulos, actor

== See also ==
- List of settlements in Arcadia
