= Grigorios Spandidakis =

Greek politician and general

- Γρηγόριος Σπαντιδάκης

Deputy Prime Minister of Greece
- In office 21 April 1967 – 13 December 1967
- Prime Minister: Konstantinos Kollias
- Preceded by: Ilias Tsirimokos
- Succeeded by: Stylianos Pattakos

Minister for National Defence of Greece
- In office 21 April 1967 – 13 December 1967
- Prime Minister: Konstantinos Kollias
- Preceded by: Panagis Papaligouras
- Succeeded by: Georgios Papadopoulos

Personal details
- Born: 1909 Rethymno, Cretan State
- Died: 28 January 1996 (aged 86–87) Papagou, Greece
- Resting place: Papagou Cemetery
- Citizenship: Cretan State (until 1913); Greece (from 1913)
- Party: Independent
- Education: Hellenic Military Academy
- Occupation: Military officer; politician

Military service
- Allegiance: Greece
- Branch/service: Hellenic Army; Cavalry
- Years of service: 1931–1967
- Rank: General
- Unit: Cavalry Division; First Army; Sacred Squadron
- Commands: I Army Corps; 20th Armoured Division; Chief of the Hellenic Army General Staff
- Battles/wars: World War II; Greco-Italian War; Battle of Greece; Greek resistance; Battle of Tunisia; Dodecanese campaign; Greek Civil War
- Awards: Cross of Valour; War Cross; Medal for Outstanding Acts; Medal of Military Merit
- Criminal information
- Status: Deceased
- Criminal charges: Treason; Mutiny

Grigorios Spandidakis (Greek: Γρηγόριος Σπαντιδάκης; 1909 – 28 January 1996) was a general of the Hellenic Army who served as the chief of the Hellenic Army General Staff from 1965 to 1967. He was a member of the military junta that ruled Greece from 1967 to 1973. He served as Deputy Prime Minister and Minister for National Defence in 1967 under the first government of Konstantinos Kollias, but was dismissed after supporting the failed counter-coup attempt launched by King Constantine II on 13 December 1967. After the fall of the regime, he was tried and convicted to life imprisonment for his role in it.

== Life ==
Grigorios Spandidakis was born in 1909, in Rethymno. He entered the Hellenic Army Academy, graduating on 5 August 1931 as a Cavalry Second Lieutenant. Promotions followed to lieutenant in 1935 and captain in 1938. Spandidakis fought in the Greco-Italian War, and was wounded during the German invasion of Greece. During the Axis Occupation of Greece, he participated in the Omiros resistance group, and in 1944 he fled to the Middle East and joined the elite Sacred Band of the Greek government in exile.

In 1946, he was promoted to Major and fought in the first operations of the Greek Civil War. In 1947 he was appointed the first head of the new Armour School, a post he held until 1949. Promoted to lieutenant colonel in the same year, he was placed for a while as aide de camp to Marshal Alexandros Papagos, followed by command of the 391 Tank Regiment. During the 1950s he was posted in a succession of staff and command posts: Operations Officer of the First Army and of the National Defense General Staff, director of the 1st Staff Office of the NATO HQ in İzmir, CO of the II Tank Battle Command, director of the Army's Organization Bureau, director of the Armour Training Centre, and CO of the 20th Armoured Division and later of the I Army Corps. In the process, he rose to Colonel (1955), Brigadier (1959), Major General (1961), and Lt. General (1964). On 9 October 1965, he was appointed Chief of the Hellenic Army General Staff.

From this position, Spandidakis became the driving force behind the Army's plans to seize power in view of the ongoing political crisis in the country, under the codename IERAX II. The Army hierarchy, supported by King Constantine II, feared the growing influence of the left, particularly after the Iouliana of 1965 and the rising anti-palace sentiment among the populace. Spandidakis promoted several officers who would later play a leading role in the coup d'état of 21 April 1967 to key positions; most notably, the then-Lieutenant Colonel Georgios Papadopoulos.

In early March 1967, in view of the oncoming legislative elections in May which the right-wing National Radical Union was widely expected to lose, preparations began for implementing the plan, and Spandidakis postponed a planned visit to the United States. Nevertheless, Spandidakis was caught by surprise by the outbreak of the military putsch of 21 April 1967, which the group of mid-level officers around Papadopoulos initiated without waiting for authorization by the King and the Army leadership. He was at first arrested by the putschists who replaced him with Odysseas Angelis, but quickly agreed to assist them. His acquiescence was a crucial factor in allowing the coup d'état to unfold smoothly: he used his authority to persuade the acting CO of the III Army Corps, Brigadier Orestis Vidalis, that the coup was sanctioned by the King, and prevented Vidalis' formation, the most powerful in the Hellenic Army, from descending upon Athens.

The putschists initially planned to name him Prime Minister, but were persuaded by the King to appoint a civilian, the judge Konstantinos Kollias, instead. In the new government, Spandidakis was thus appointed Deputy Prime Minister and Minister of National Defence. When King Constantine II tried to overthrow the junta on 13 December 1967, Spandidakis was on a NATO summit. He supported the failed attempt, and was dismissed from his offices.

After the fall of the junta in 1974, he was tried and condemned to life imprisonment for his role in the coup d'état, but released on grounds of ill health.

He died at his home in Papagou, on 28 January 1996, at age 87.

Military offices
Preceded by Lt General Ioannis Gennimatas	Chief of the Hellenic Army General Staff; 9 October 1965 – 21 April 1967	Succeeded by Lt General Odysseas Angelis
Political offices
Preceded by Georgios Athanasiadis-Novas (in the 1965–1966 Stefanopoulos cabinet)	Deputy Prime Minister of Greece; 21 April – 13 December 1967	Succeeded by Stylianos Pattakos
Preceded by Panagis Papaligouras	Minister of National Defence of Greece; 21 April – 13 December 1967	Succeeded by Georgios Papadopoulos
