= 1968 Greek constitutional referendum =

- 15 November 1968

Results
Choice	Votes	%
Yes	4,713,421	92.11%
No	403,829	7.89%
Valid votes	5,117,250	99.68%
Invalid or blank votes	16,656	0.32%
Total votes	5,133,906	100.00%
Registered voters/turnout	6,606,111	77.71%

A constitutional referendum was held in Greece on 15 November 1968. Voters were asked whether they wished to ratify a new constitution prepared by the dictatorial regime. It was approved by 92.1% of voters, with a voter turnout of 77.7%.

== Background ==
A military junta, presided over by Colonel Georgios Papadopoulos, had ruled Greece since a group of middle-ranking officers staged a coup on 21 April 1967. King Constantine II reluctantly endorsed the coup, but started preparing for a counter-coup by elements of the armed forces loyal to him. The counter-coup, launched on 13 December 1967, failed, and the King and the royal family fled to Italy. In the aftermath of the royal coup attempt, the King was replaced by a regent, General Georgios Zoitakis, and Papadopoulos assumed the post of Prime Minister.

On 16 December, Papadopoulos announced that the new constitution, which had been prepared by a committee of legal experts under Charilaos Mitrelias, President of the Council of State, was to be formally presented to the people on 16 March 1968, and subsequently confirmed by a plebiscite in summer. The original draft of the Mitrelias Committee, however, was deemed too liberal, and was heavily amended in the following months. In its final form, as presented on 11 July 1968, it retained the monarchy, but granted the armed forces autonomy from governmental and parliamentary control and entrusted them with the role of guardians of the status quo, it imposed restrictions on political parties and established a constitutional watchdog, the Constitutional Court, with wide-ranging powers, to regulate the country's political life.

The referendum itself was proclaimed for 29 September, and was regarded by the regime as a public vote of support on its policies. Participation was made obligatory and abstention punishable by imprisonment. The regime employed extensive propaganda in favour of a "yes" vote, while any opposition was silenced. The referendum's results were thus predictably in favour of the new constitution. The vote, despite obligatory participation, was still marked by a high abstention, which reached over 22%.

== Results ==
Choice	Votes	%
For	4,713,421	92.11
Against	403,829	7.89
Total	5,117,250	100.00
Valid votes	5,117,250	99.68
Invalid/blank votes	16,656	0.32
Total votes	5,133,906	100.00
Registered voters/turnout	6,606,111	77.71
Source: Nohlen & Stöver
