= Greek Constitution of 1968 =

The Greek Constitution of 1968 (Greek: Σύνταγμα του 1968) was a largely unimplemented constitution of Greece promulgated in May 1968 by the military regime which had been ruling Greece since the coup on 21 April 1967. It was confirmed by a plebiscite in September 1968 following an intensive three-month propaganda campaign by the regime.

== Planned return of Constantine II and parliamentary elections ==
It retained the Greek monarchy, and envisaged a return to a parliamentary system. The parliament was to be reduced to 150 members. King Constantine II, who had been in self-exile since his failed counter-coup on 13 December 1967, would be allowed to return after the first parliamentary election unless the government called him back sooner. However, the junta, headed by Prime Minister Georgios Papadopoulos, stated that elections would not be held until the "Greek mentality" had been sufficiently reformed. Most of the guarantees of civil rights were suspended until civilian rule could be restored.

== Regulatory role for the Greek military and creation of a National Security Council ==
The constitution explicitly reserved a regulatory role for the Greek military, which was tasked with the "maintenance of the social and political order". Further watchdogs were envisaged in the form of a constitutional court and a powerful National Security Council. In the event, as elections were never held and military rule continued, the constitution was never fully implemented. It was replaced by the Greek Constitution of 1973, again drafted by the junta, which abolished the monarchy and created a presidential republic (see Metapolitefsi).
