= Georgios Zoitakis =

Regent of Greece from 1967 to 1972

- Γεώργιος Ζωιτάκης
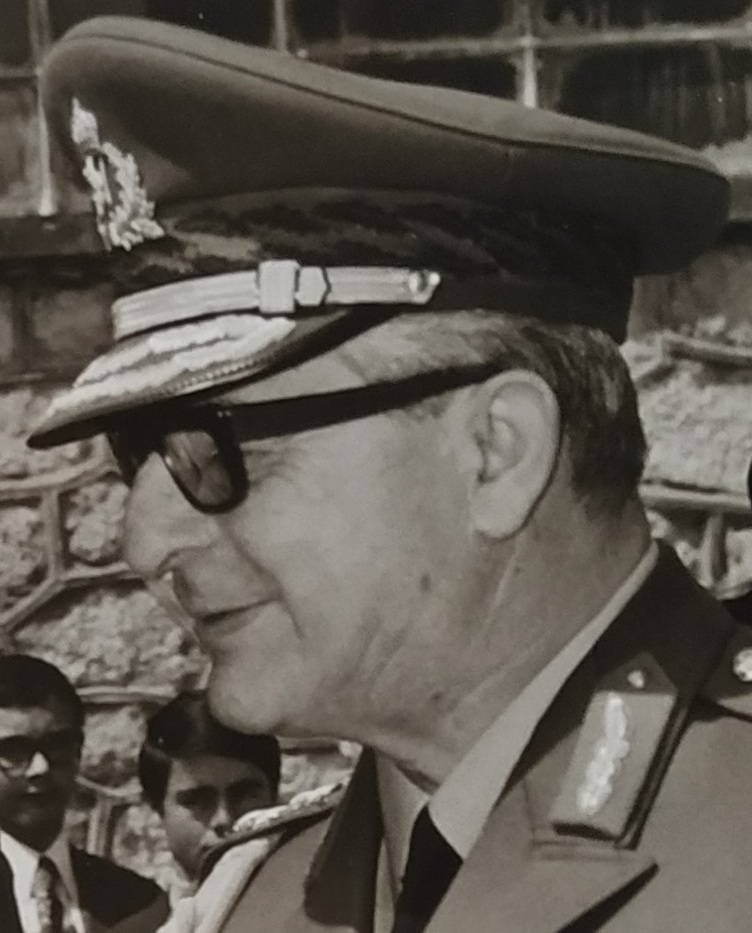
- Zoitakis in 1971

Regent of Greece
- In office 13 December 1967 – 21 March 1972
- Monarch: Constantine II
- Preceded by: Constantine II
- Succeeded by: Georgios Papadopoulos

Deputy Minister of National Defence of Greece
- In office 22 April 1967 – 13 December 1967
- Prime Minister: Konstantinos Kollias
- Preceded by: Konstantinos Hourdakis (acting)
- Succeeded by: Ioannis Katsadimas

Personal details
- Born: 3 March 1910 Nafpaktos, Greece
- Died: 21 October 1996 (aged 86) Papagou, Greece
- Resting place: Nafpaktos, Greece
- Party: Independent
- Spouse: Sofia Vouranzeri (died 1990)
- Children: 1
- Education: Hellenic Military Academy; National and Kapodistrian University of Athens (attended)
- Occupation: Military officer; politician
- Civilian awards: Order of the Redeemer; Order of Honour; Order of George I; Order of the Phoenix

Military service
- Allegiance: Greece
- Branch/service: Hellenic Army; Infantry
- Years of service: 1932–1972
- Rank: General
- Battles/wars: World War II; Greco-Italian War; Greek resistance; Dekemvriana; Greek Civil War; 1967 Greek coup d'état
- Military awards: Cross of Valour (3); War Cross; Medal of Military Merit
- Criminal information
- Status: Deceased
- Criminal charges: Treason; Mutiny

Georgios Zoitakis (Greek: Γεώργιος Ζωιτάκης; 3 March 1910 – 21 October 1996) was a general of the Hellenic Army and member of the military junta that ruled Greece from 1967 to 1973. He served as Deputy Minister of National Defence and upon the departure of King Constantine II from Greece in 1967 he served as Regent of Greece (1967–1972).

== Life ==
Georgios Zoitakis was born on 3 March 1910 in Nafpaktos. He graduated from the Hellenic Military Academy in 1932, and fought in the Greco-Italian War and the Battle of Greece in an Evzone battalion with the rank of lieutenant. During the Axis Occupation of Greece, he joined the EDES guerrillas in his native Aetolia-Acarnania. During the civil conflict between EDES and the leftist EAM-ELAS in late 1943, his father Konstantinos was killed by ELAS fighters. In fall 1944, he too was captured by ELAS and kept prisoner until the Varkiza agreement in the spring of 1945. He then re-joined the Army and fought in the Greek Civil War, rising to the rank of major. For his military service, he thrice received, among other awards, Greece's highest medal for bravery, the Gold Cross of Valour, an extremely rare honour.

In the 1950s he attended staff officer courses in the Superior School of War and the School of National Defense in Greece parallel to NATO military seminars in West Germany and in the United States. During this period he served as adjutant to King Pávlos, then Chief of Staff to the First Army as Brigadier, CO of the I Army Corps as Major General and of the III Army Corps in Thessaloniki, then the most important Greek military formation, as lieutenant general. On 21 April 1967, the day of the Colonels' coup, he was in Athens. Like most of the senior military leadership, he was caught by surprise at the events, but he quickly moved to support the coup. On the same day, he was placed as Deputy Minister of National Defence in the new government.

Following the failure of King Constantine II's counter-coup on 13 December 1967 and the subsequent flight of the royal family to Italy, Zoitakis was sworn in as Regent for the absent King. He held this post until 21 March 1972, when he was replaced by the junta's principal leader, Prime Minister Georgios Papadopoulos. At the same time, he was retired from the Army with the rank of full general. On 1 June 1973, Papadopoulos would abolish the monarchy and declare himself President of a new republic.

After Greece's return to democracy, in 1975 Zoitakis, along with the other junta leaders, was tried and convicted to life imprisonment for high treason. He remained in prison for 13 years until 1988, when he was released, due to deteriorating health. A pardon plea was rejected in 1991, and he remained confined to his residence in Athens until his death in 1996.

He married Sofia Vouranzeri (1926–1990), and they had a daughter, Vicky Vakou (b. 1949).

Zoitakis died at his home, in Papagou, on 21 October 1996, at age 86. He was buried in his birthplace, Nafpaktos.

Political offices
Vacant Title last held by Crown Prince Constantine	Regent of Greece; 1967–1972	Succeeded by Georgios Papadopoulos
