= Ioannis Gennimatas =

Greek army officer

- Ιωάννης Γεννηματάς
- Born: c. 1910; Gytheio, Kingdom of Greece
- Died: c. 1981; Third Hellenic Republic
- Relatives: Georgios Gennimatas (nephew)
- Military career
- Allegiance: (Greece) Second Hellenic Republic; Kingdom of Greece
- Branch: Hellenic Army
- Service years: 1930–1965
- Rank: Lieutenant General
- Commands: Chief of the Hellenic Army General Staff
- Wars: World War II: Greco-Italian War; Battle of Greece; Greek Civil War
- Awards: Gold Cross of Valour

Ioannis Gennimatas (Greek: Ιωάννης Γεννηματάς; 1910–1981) was a Hellenic Army officer who rose to the rank of lieutenant general and the post of Chief of the Hellenic Army General Staff in 1964–65. An ardently right-wing and royalist officer, he is notable for his involvement against the Centre Union party in the 1960s, which led to the political crisis of July 1965.

== Life ==
Ioannis Gennimatas was born in Gytheio, Laconia, in 1910. He entered the Hellenic Army Academy and graduated as a second lieutenant on 23 July 1930. He was promoted to lieutenant in 1934 and captain in 1937. He fought in the Greco-Italian War and during the attempts to halt the German invasion of Greece in April 1941. In August 1944 he fled from occupied Greece to the Middle East, where he joined the armed forces of the Greek government in exile as a company commander. In 1945, he was promoted to Major and fought in the Greek Civil War as company and battalion commander, ending the war with the rank of lieutenant colonel and as chief of staff of the 36th Brigade.

Subsequently he served as commander of the 5/42 Evzone Regiment, was promoted to colonel (1953) and became commanding officer of the Greek Expeditionary Force in Korea (1954). He then commanded the 3rd Infantry Regiment and the 2nd Infantry Division, taught at the War Academy and served as its commander, before rising to First Deputy Chief of the General Staff and later CO of the II Army Corps. In 1960 he was promoted to major general and in 1962 to lieutenant general.

Gennimatas was widely regarded as an enemy of the Centre Union, and had been involved in the allegations of massive fraud in the 1961 parliamentary elections. After the Centre Union achieved a major victory in the November 1963 and February 1964 elections, its leader, Georgios Papandreou, favoured Lt General Andreas Siapkaras for the powerful post of Chief of the General Staff. Nevertheless, Gennimatas was chosen as the new Chief of the Army General Staff on 19 April 1964, as part of a tacit agreement between Papandreou and King Constantine II that had allowed Papandreou to accede to the premiership in exchange for not interfering with the King's control over the armed forces.

In June 1965, however, Papandreou tried to solidify his control over the armed forces and planned to dismiss Gennimatas. This move was vehemently opposed by the King, but also by Papandreou's own Defence Minister, Petros Garoufalias, and led to a major rift between Papandreou and the Palace. The political crisis culminated in the "Iouliana" of 1965 – the defection of several Centre Union MPs, the dismissal of Papandreou and his replacement by a series of Palace-supported governments. The crisis deepened the rift in Greek society between progressive/republican factions and the conservative/monarchical establishment, and led to the establishment of the Greek military junta of 1967–74.

Gennimatas himself retired from his post and from the Army on 8 October 1965, and died in 1981. His nephew, Georgios Gennimatas, was a founding member of PASOK and minister in various PASOK governments between 1981 and 1994.

Military offices
Preceded by Lt General Petros Sakellariou	Chief of the Hellenic Army General Staff; 19 April 1964 – 8 October 1965	Succeeded by Lt General Grigorios Spandidakis
