= Greek Constitution of 1973 =

Σύνταγμα της Ελλάδος

Overview
- Jurisdiction: Greece
- Presented: June 15, 1975; 51 years ago
- Ratified: July 29, 1973; 52 years ago
- Date effective: August 19, 1973; 52 years ago
- System: Presidential republic (until December 1973); Unitary parliamentary republic (until August 1974)
- Head of state: President of the Hellenic Republic
- Chambers: Hellenic Parliament (nominally)

History
- Repealed: 1 August, 1974; 51 years ago
- Amendments: 2
- Last amended: 31 December, 1973; 52 years ago
- Supersedes: 1968 Constitution of the Kingdom of Greece
- Superseded by: 1952 Constitution of the Kingdom of Greece (provisionally)
- Repealed by Constituent Act On the restoration of democratic legitimacy and the regulation of public life until the final determination of the political regime and the drafting of a new Constitution of the country (1/8/1974, ΦΕΚ Α΄ 213)

The Greek Constitution of 1973 (Greek: Σύνταγμα του 1973) was an amended version of the Greek Constitution of 1968 (which was never fully enacted) by the Greek dictator Georgios Papadopoulos, with the aim of abolishing the Greek monarchy. Papadopoulos's rewrite of the 1968 constitution replaced the terms "parliamentary monarchy" and "King" with "republican democracy" and "president of Greece". The constitution was enacted as part of Papadopoulos's failed attempt at liberalisation of his regime, but, like its 1968 predecessor, never fully implemented.

== Background ==
In early 1973, the Papadopoulos regime experienced for the first time organised protests against its dictatorial government. In February 1973, the Law School student uprising started when law students occupied the Athens Law School protesting against the dictators and was a precursor to the Athens Polytechnic uprising. The public unrest against the regime was followed by an attempted coup against Papadopoulos organised by the Greek Navy.

The dictators strongly suspected that King Constantine II, who was already in exile due to an earlier coup attempt against them in December 1967, was also behind the second navy coup attempt. The dictator used the navy coup attempt as a pretext to strengthen his position by removing the King, whom he considered his last major, non-junta related, antagonist for power. A month later, in June 1973, Papadopoulos proceeded to abolish the monarchy and declare Greece a presidential republic, simultaneously appointing himself to the new position as Greece's head of state.

Not wasting any time, the regime proceeded in July of the same year to hold a rigged referendum which ratified the new constitution with 21.56% supporting the monarchy and 78.44% against it. Papadopoulos's attempt at engineering a new political system in Greece ultimately failed and the new constitution was never enacted.

== Analysis ==
The 1973 constitution is the second constitution in modern Greek history, after its predecessor constitution of 1968, to have resulted from a failed coup attempt by the Royal Hellenic Navy. The 1973 constitution contravenes article 137 paragraph 1 of its predecessor 1968 constitution which states "The fundamental provisions of the Constitution as well as those that designate the form of government as a Crowned Democracy can never be revised". Due to this contravention of article 137 of its predecessor, the 1973 constitution has been characterised as "revolutionary". The 1973 constitution was replaced by the current Greek constitution in 1975, during the metapolitefsi period.

The timing of the constitution's passage after a royalist coup attempt is especially evident by the fact that, on the one hand, it explicitly called for the confiscation by law of all royal property to which the usual requirement of a fair compensation would not apply, and on the other hand, it prohibited members of the former royal family of Greece from holding elective office.

== Powers of the president ==
Under the 1973 constitution, the President of Greece had direct and exclusive executive power in matters of public order, foreign affairs and national defence. While a similar practice would arise 13 years later as the presidential prerogative in a state of cohabitation under the constitution of the Fifth French Republic, the Greek provision was intended as a nod to the armed forces and was designed to assure them that the power was resting with the president of the republic. Indeed, the presidential authority in those domains extended far beyond simple determination of policy guidelines: The President could appoint and dismiss the ministers of public order, foreign affairs and national defence independently of the prime minister and unilaterally determined the state budget in those matters (only amendable by a two-thirds parliamentary supermajority), while Parliament's ability to regulate these matters in legislation was severely curtailed in favor of regulation by presidential decree.

The 1973 constitution also gave legislative powers to the president as well as the parliament of Greece. While Parliament was expanded from 150 members to 200, only 180 MPs were elected; the remaining 20 were appointed by the President, giving practical effect to the presidential legislative power. The president had the authority to veto laws subject to an override by an absolute majority in Parliament, but the parliamentary override could itself be overridden by the President, who could then call a referendum to finally decide whether the bill should become law.

Article 49, paragraph 2, of the 1973 constitution enabled the president to directly command the armed forces and to also choose the commander-in-chief and commanders of the branches of the armed forces. This marks a change from the 1968 constitution, where they were chosen by a National Defense Council. However, as the first President was Georgios Papadopoulos himself, any hypothetical civilian control of the armed forces this change could grant never manifested. Even so, this hypothetical civilian control would have created an internal contradiction, since the provisions of the 1968 Constitution tasking the military with the "maintenance of the social and political order" were left unatlered.

== Later amendments and abolition ==
Papadopoulos' regime would not survive to implement the envisaged presidential system; on November 25th, just over a month since the Constitution was published on the Government Gazette, Ioannides toppled Papadopoulos and the Markezinis Cabinet. General Phaedon Gizikis was installed as President of the Republic and Adamantios Androutsopoulos as Prime Minister, while Ioannides ruled from the shadows.

The constitution was amended by a constituent act on 17 December 1973 as follows:

- the tenure of the President was limited to 5 years
- the President would no longer directly conduct defence, security, public order and foreign policy, determine state budget and appoint ministers in said domains independently of the prime minister, and regulation by decree without ministerial approbation on said issues was abolished
- no MPs were to be appointed, whenever elections were to be held
- the institutions of the Vice President of Greece and Governmental Commissioners in universities were abolished.

The relevant articles were stricken from the constitution, including the transitory articles 137 & 140 which stipulated that municipal and parliamentary elections should be called for by the end of 1973. A second constituent act (31/12/1973) abolished the Constitutional Court of Greece.

Consequently, the system was amended to what could be described as a "quasi-parliamentary" republic, as it resembled the ministerial council-centered separation of powers under the 1952 constitution, but for the presence of a Sovereign and an active Parliament. The amendment had little effect on the political life of a country under martial law.

The Constitution would remain in place until 1 August, 1974 when the Karamanlis administration reverted in effect the 1952 constitution but for the monarchy-related provisions, and abolished the 1973 revision of the 1968 constitution. General Gizikis remained as President pro tempore until the 1974 referendum, having the same limited duties: countersignature of laws, presidential decrees and constituent acts.
