= Fix (beer) =

Greek beer brand

- Native name: Φιξ
- Industry: Brewery
- Founded: 1864
- Founder: Johann Karl Fix
- Headquarters: Kifisia, Athens, Greece
- Products: Beer
- Owner: Chitos AVEE
- Website: Fix Beer Website

Fix Brewery (Greek: Φιξ) was founded in 1864 by Johann Karl Fix in Athens and is the first major brewery in Greece. About 30 years earlier, his father had started brewing beer in Greece. As purveyor to the court of the Greek king, the company was able to maintain a monopoly position in the Greek market for about 100 years. After the bankruptcy of the company in 1983 and several failed attempts to revive it, Fix beer has been brewed again in its own brewery since 2009.

== History ==
=== Beer enjoyment in the young Greek state ===
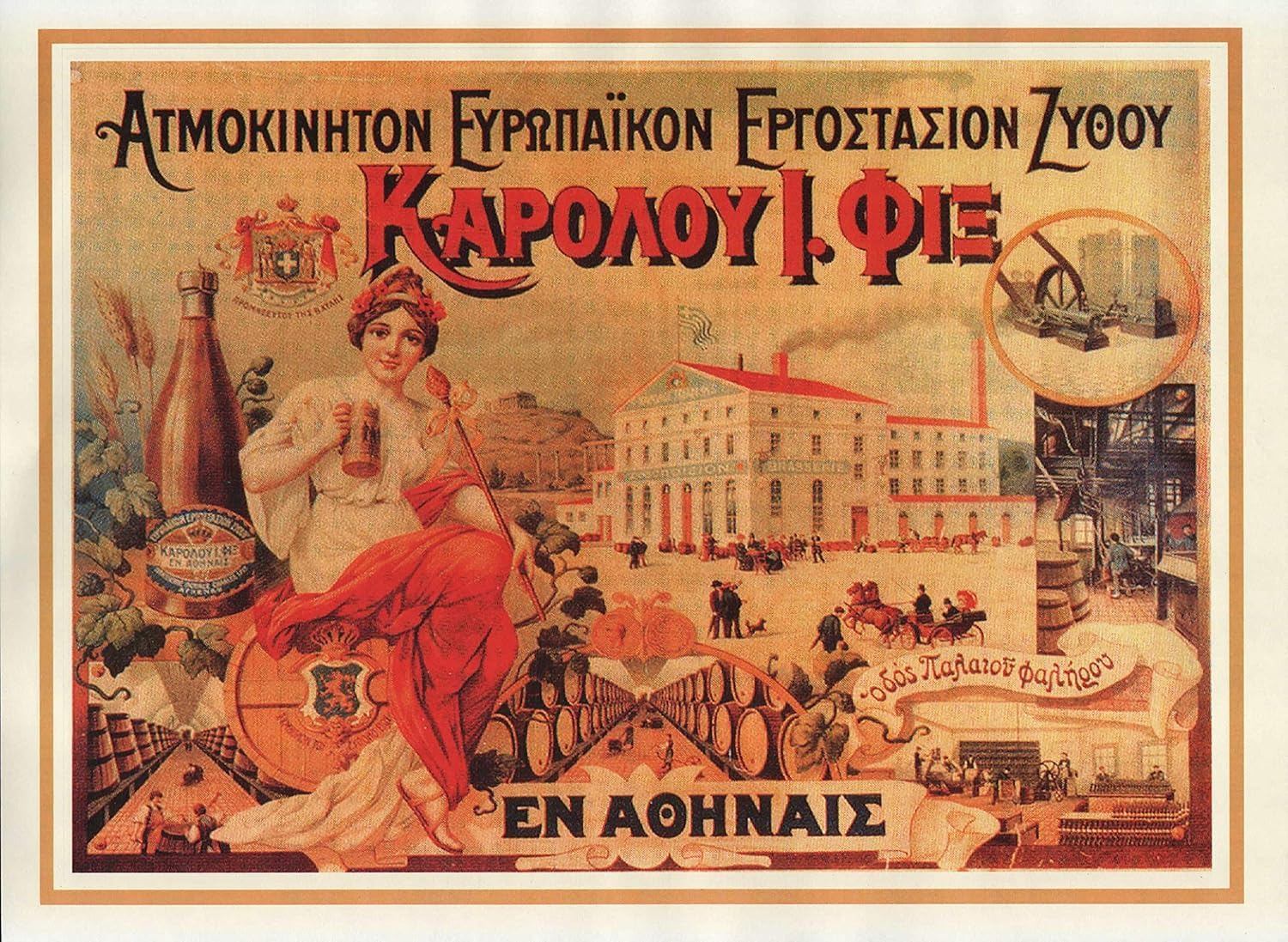
19th-century advertisement about the 'Steam-driven European Brewery' of Karl Fix

In 1833, Adolph von Schaden, in a report about the Bavarian emigrants, mentioned the popularity of the British Porter beer among the Greek aristocracy. The same year, beer was also exported from Naples to Greece. Already before the Greek Revolution, there had been a first successful attempt to brew beer in Greece by an Armenian brewer in Tripoli. Briefly, damage to the beer production in Greece predicted good economic successes and recommended, in particular, Joseph Pschorr, to send one of his sons to build a brewery in Greece.

=== Foundation of the Athenian brewery ===
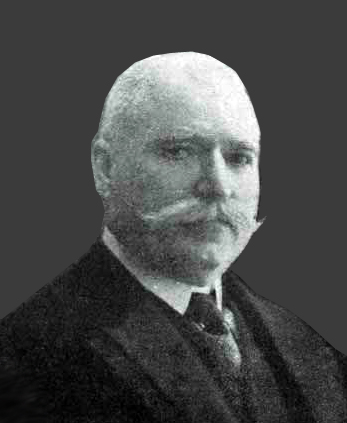
Karl Johann Fix (Karolos Ioannou Fix), the son of Johann Ludwig Fix

The brewery founder's father, Johann Adam Fix, a miner from Edelbach in Spessart, had followed the call of King Otto to Greece and had - like other Bavarians - settled in Iraklion near Athens. He was responsible in the management of the mines in Kymi, Euboea. Earlier, he had left his son Johann Georg behind with his mother. When Johann Georg traveled to his father at the age of twenty, he was to be picked up in Piraeus; but his father was murdered on the way by robbers. After the event, Johann Georg Fix was rescued in Iraklion, he stayed there and started to import barrels of beer from Bavaria. Later, he decided to produce beer himself and launched a small enterprise selling his home-made beer in Kolonaki (today a expensive and celebrated shopping area in the heart of Athens), which was a good place for socialising for the Athenian Bavarian community. Joseph von Ow, who was in the service of the Athenian royal court in 1837–39, wrote in his memoirs:

"The Bavarian compatriots have company among themselves. - A brewery has been in operation in Athens for two years and is being used heavily. Professor G. Everus from Oldenburg rightly notes how excellent it must be for a Bavarian soul to have his patriotic drink here - on the border of the Orient! A society> To the Green Tree <(with garden, bowling alley, stone beer steins, singing and loud conversations) reminds of the far bank of the Isar! "

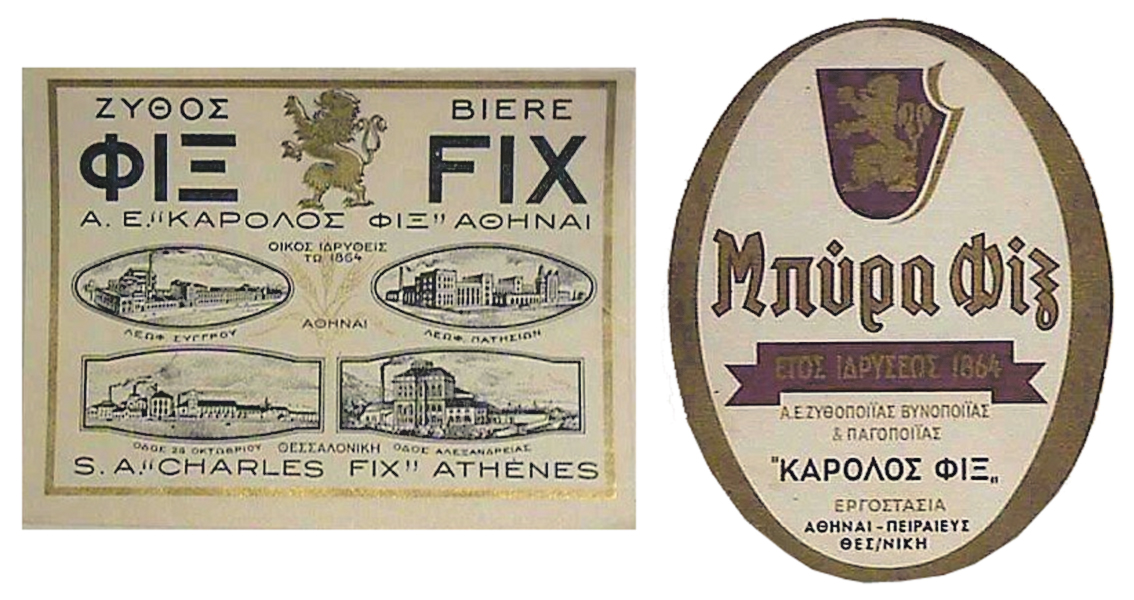
Labels until the end of the 1920s with the Bavarian lion logo.

Around 1840, the beer is said to have prevailed throughout Greece. Johann Ludwig's son Karl Johann Fix (Karolos Ioannou Fix) in 1864 founded the Fix brewery in Athens, coinciding with the appointment of the next king of Greece, George I, from beer-loving Denmark. The new royal court encouraged Charles's efforts, and Fix Company soon became the official purveyor to the Greek Royal Court, and has been the only major in the country till the middle of the 20th century. It was located at the foot of Lycabettus also in Kolonaki and competed with small breweries such as Gulielmos (Wilhelm) and imported beer from Trieste and Vienna (Schwechat). The German brewers (including Fix) are said to have barely met the demand for beer and "became wealthy in a short time". Beer was therefore more expensive than wine. Around 1905, 89,000 hectoliters were produced in eleven breweries.

=== Monopoly ===
Unlike the breweries Fischer (Φίσερ), Bachauer (Μπαχάουερ) and Melcher (Μέλχερ), the Fix beer was characterized by a constant quality and had prevailed since at least the first half of the 20th century. In 1925, the brewery invested in a refrigerating machine with a capacity of 2 to 6 million BTU by Sulzer AG, which cooled the entire cellar. Until the 1950s, this was one of the most powerful compressors ever. Previously, it was only cooled with bar ice, of which one built by LA Riedinger plant produced 1000 kg a day. "The good and light fix beer (birra) was available in every restaurant. It cost 5 drachmas per glass of beer, 18 drachmas per 1 bottle" as mentioned in a 1937 Athens travel guide. During the Nazi occupation of Athens, Antonios and Elli Fix hid the Jewess Yvonne Molho in their house. In November 2004, their names were added to the Righteous Among the Nations list. At that time, the brewery also had its own bar in Patisia, which was visited mainly by Germans.

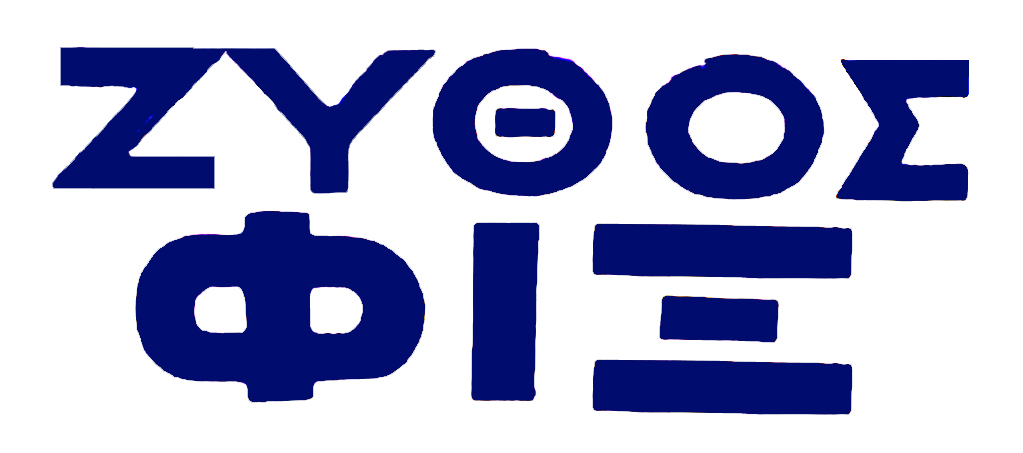
The late 1920s logo, blue / white combined with rhombic design features

After studying chemistry at the University of Lausanne and two years of working as a chemist in the Greek military, Karolos Fix, the son of Antonios, took over in 1950 the management of the company and the technical director during the 1960s was the German Dr. Karl Lietz. In 1965, the new brewery designed by Takis Zenetos was opened on Syngrou Avenue. The high profits from the de facto beer monopoly were partly invested in other beverage companies, which also sought a monopolistic position, including Tam-Tam (a Cola drink) and Retsina Plaka (retsina was then the most popular table wine).

The brewery advertised labels with the status of court purveyor of the Greek court and with reference to 38 won gold medals.

=== Decline and bankruptcy ===
In the early 1960s, the brewery was accused of quasi-monopoly that specifically prevents the market entry of other breweries in Greece. On 15 July 1965, the government took the decision to facilitate the entry of foreign breweries into the market. In the same year Amstel Hellas was initiated as branch of the Dutch brand Amstel.

After the politician Petros Garoufalias, had married into the Fix family, the company's reputation was badly damaged, as Garoufalias was associated with the Iouliana of 1965 and supported the Greek Junta. The slogan "(η μπίρα Φιξ κάνει καλό" ('Fix beer does good') was reworded as "η μπίρα Φιξ κάνει κακό" ('fix beer does bad'). "No one wants to drink more junta beer," as mentioned by the Der Spiegel in 1974.

In 1977–1983, the brewery's shareholders filed a legal dispute, first with the municipality of Athens and then with the state, which involved the provision of real estate and the relocation of the brewery. Fix wanted to convert the brewery facilities into a shopping center. Meanwhile, there too many new breweries were launched, mostly as branches of foreign brewers (u. A. Löwenbräu Hellas, Henninger Hellas, Amstel, Heineken ) and Fix lost enormous market share. Karolos Fix, descendant of the founder, and his wife Ninetta moved their main residence in 1982 to Gstaad, where many Greek millionaires live. In the same year, Karolos started the Fix Asset Management, which today manages assets of €12 billion in 300 funds. A year later the brewery Fix went bankrupt. The naming rights went to the National Bank of Greece, where the brewery was heavily in debt. The former company archive has since been located in the Historical Archive of Macedonia in Thessaloniki.

=== Resurgence of the brand Fix ===
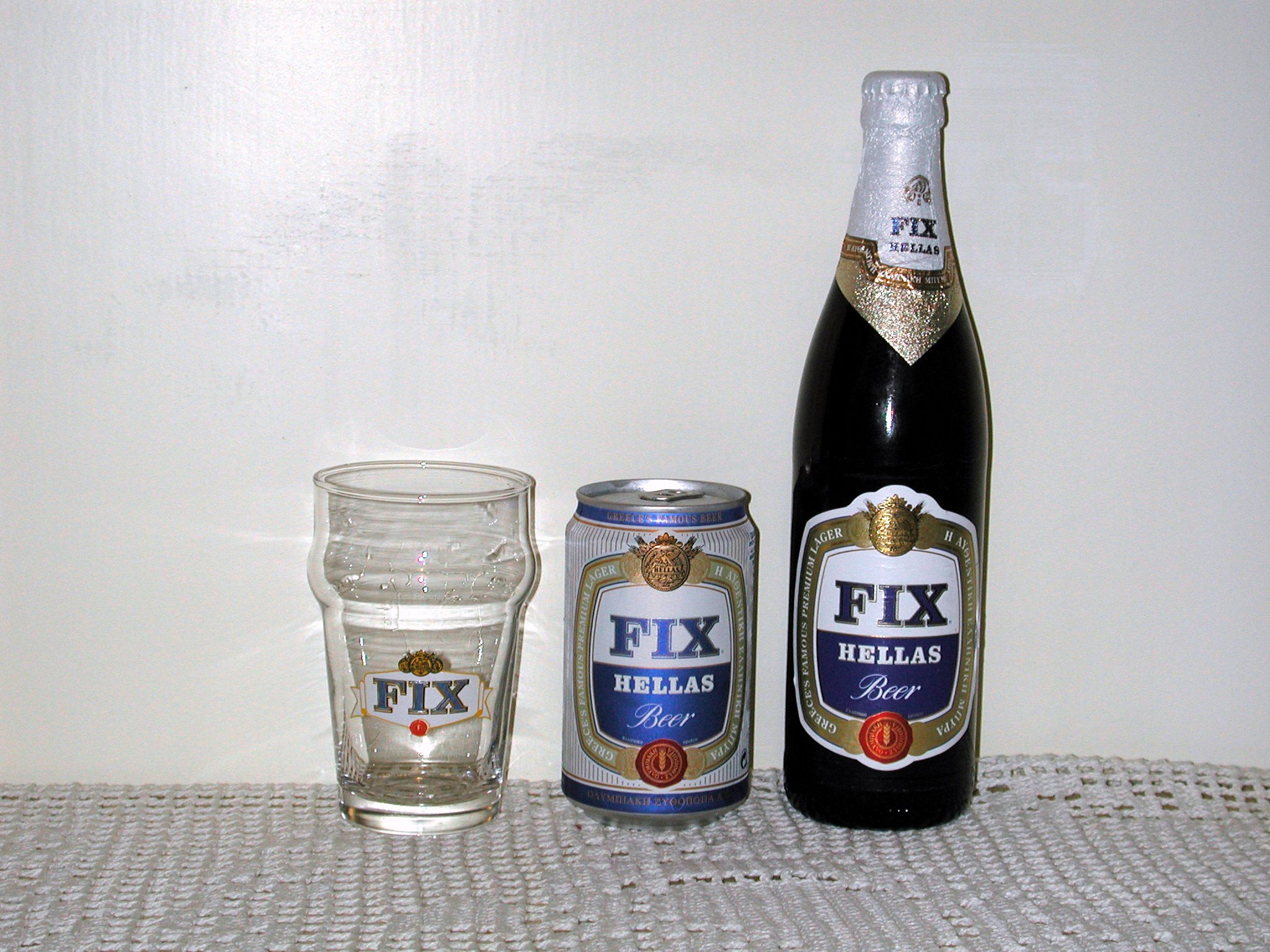
Can and bottle until 2009

Already in 1985 John Manolakos from the company Greco-Roman Importers from Florida had tried to revive the brand and brew a beer called FIX Special at Carlsberg in Greece. The project failed for unknown reasons. In 1995 Aris Zizis protected the Fix 1864 Special brand in the United States with the aim of brewing the beer at the Holsten brewery in Germany and exporting it to the US and Greece. Kourtakis had in the meantime acquired the trademark rights of the old brewery from the owner National Bank of Greece for 120 million drachma plus 1.5 percent of sales and could thus prevent the misappropriation of the trade mark. He founded the Olympic Brewery (Olymbiaki Zythopiia Ολυμπιακή Ζυθοποιία) and had the beer brewed in the varieties Lager and Export at Mythos in Atalanta near Thessaloniki. The success was rather small. Meanwhile, Fix was authorized brewed in the US and Canada. In the meantime, Karolos Fix had a beer brewed in Holland according to his own old recipe and the name Karolos I. Fix, which was sold in Greece via the supermarket chain of his brother-in-law Marinopoulos. However, this was stopped in court. The fix brand started to be produced in 2008 by the Olympic Brewery to Greek microbreweries (Ellinikes Mikrozythopiies, Ελληνικές Μικροζυθοποιίες), since the output was only 1000 hectoliters. Sklavenitis was the only supermarket chain to sell the beer.

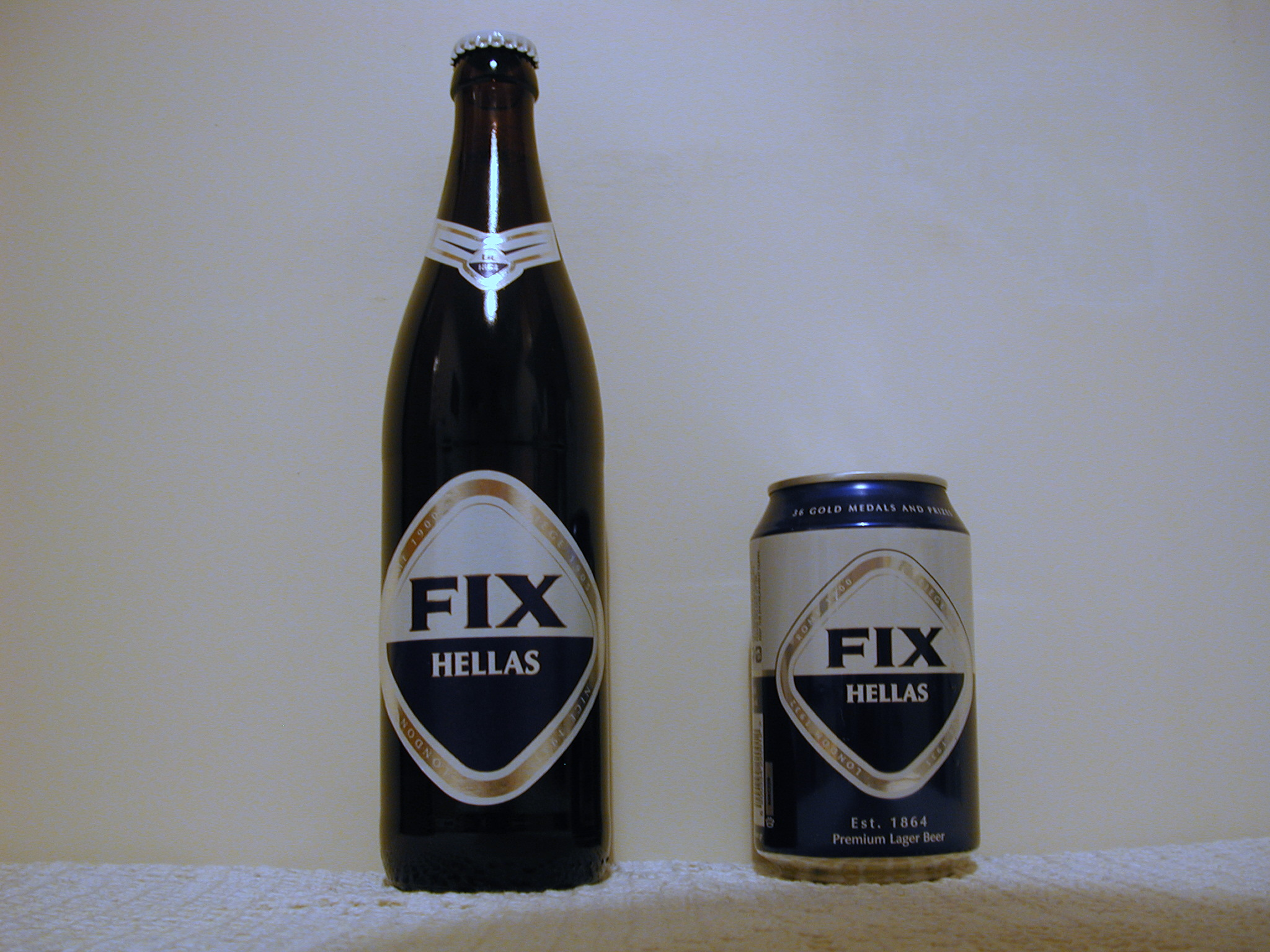
Can and bottle since 2010

In 2009, the Olympic Brewery was sold to the previous minority shareholder Chitos AVEE. The old Fix logo was reintroduced and a separate brewery for the brand was put into operation in Ritsona of Euboea island. There, only lager beer with an alcohol content of 5% is brewed. In 2009 there was achieved a beer output of 150,000 hectoliters. The ingredients come from organic agriculture, although the product bears no biolabel. Since 2010, FIX beer has been available again. The relaunched beer has a new label, with references to the gold medals and prizes won by the original FIX beer. An aggressive advertising campaign, with references to the strong historic legacy of FIX beer in the Greek society, has dramatically boosted sales, effectively leading to a strong comeback of the brand.

Ownership and usage of the historic trademark has been a source of conflict; there are Fix Beers brewed in the United States and in Canada which claim to use the Fix recipes.

== Former brewery locations ==
The company has had breweries in several locations at different times, including the following in Attica: Karneadou / corner Irodotou street, Timoleontos street 7 (now Ypsilantou), Gragratetta field to Makrigianni / Kallirois street, and finally Syngrou Avenue. Also: Heraklion, Kolonaki and Patissia. Plus at least two locations in Thessaloniki.

=== The brewery at Syngrou ===
The old brewery on Syngrou Avenue, was demolished and replaced in 1965 by a new building. This is an early work by Takis Zenetos, an 'Enfant terrible' of Greek architecture. Nevertheless, because of its size, it became the symbol of an ignorant large-scale industry, and its residents called for its demolition and the construction of a park back in 1982.

In 1994, the former brewery building on Syngrou Avenue was sold to the Attiko Metro subway operator, who intended to build an underground garage and a park above. Numerous preservationists and fans of the architect demonstrated. After partial demolition of about 40% of the building and fierce protests, the car park investor gave in and limited himself to the already demolished area, where a lower building was built. The remainder was donated for future use as a museum of modern art. Today it is the site of the National Museum of Contemporary Art, Athens. The subway station Athens, which opened in 2001 directly next to the building, and an overhead tram stop are named Syngrou-Fix.

=== The brewery at Patisia ===
In 1900 K. Klonaridis built a large brewery complex at the intersection of Patision / Kaftantzoglou north Athens, which was acquired in 1930 by Fix and was ultimately used for the production of ice cream. The historic structure was demolished in 2000, following a directive from the Athens Mayor Dimitris Avramopoulos, after a battle for its preservation was lost in favor of creating a park. All that remained was Villa Klonaridi, residence of the builder. Opposite still reminds a Café Fix to the location of the brewery, the area was named after the first owner Klonaridis.

=== Thessaloniki ===
Near the harbor (October 26 street) there is an ensemble of brick buildings and ruins. On the site, previously occupied by a vineyard, the brewery was built in 1882 under German Mizrachi Fernandez (Μισραχή-Φερνάντεζ) plans, and was renamed in 1912 to brewery Olymbos (Ζυθοποιείο ΟΛΥΜΠΟΣ), and after a merger as Olymbos Naoussa. Fix acquired the brewery in 1926 and brewed at the site until the bankruptcy in 1983. On the outside of the building are still large writings with the inscription ZYTHOPIIA KAROLOS FIX, The abandoned buildings were at first occupied illegally and used for cultural events and social events and then regularly rented. Requests for monument protection were dismissed several times, in part challenged by the owners of the site. Since 2004, the site is irrevocably under monument protection law. A restoration remains uncertain.

== Beer in Greece ==
The market is dominated by three major breweries, Athenian Brewery with the brands Heineken and Amstel comes to 70%, followed by Carlsberg A / S with the brands Mythos, Henninger, Foster's and Guinness . Third place goes to the Olympic Brewery, owner of the brand Fix. 95% of the beer consumed is produced in Greece.

In general, beer consumption in Mediterranean countries is well below the European average. Greece is no exception, but ranked ahead of Italy and France in 1995. Beer consumption increased by 20% between 1996 and 2004, whereas beer is a pure seasonal beverage in Greece, 60% of the bottles sold are sold between May and September. Beer consumption in Greece is strongly weather dependent.

== Trivia ==
- In 1904 the brewery Fix & Cie was founded in Niedermendig. It is not related to the Athenian brewery.
- The later composer Manos Hadjidakis worked in his youth as a worker at Fix.
- Mühldorf am Inn (the hometown of the founder of the brewery) and Heraklion, the later headquarters of the brewery, established a town twinning.
- In Palio Faliro there is an Ioannou-Fix-Street, named after Johann Ludwig Fix.
