= Vice President of Greece =

Vice President of the Hellenic Republic
- Ἀντιπρόεδρος τῆς Ἑλληνικῆς Δημοκρατίας
- Emblem of the Hellenic Republic (1973-1974)

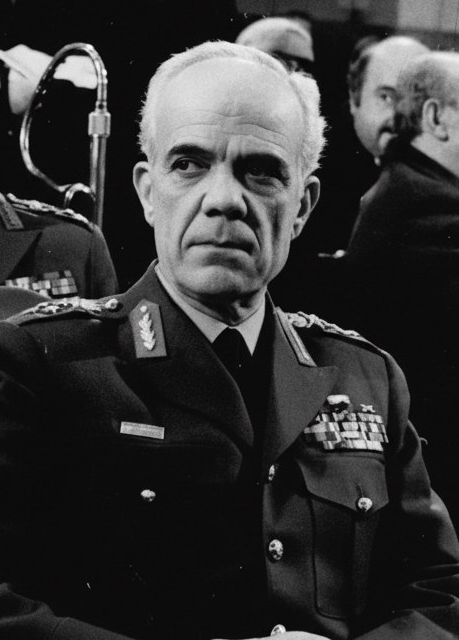
- Only officeholder Odysseas Aggelis; 16 August 1973 to 25 November 1973
- Appointer: President of Greece
- Term length: 7 years Non renewable
- Constituting instrument: Greek Constitution of 1973
- Formation: 16 August 1973
- First holder: Odysseas Angelis
- Final holder: Odysseas Angelis
- Abolished: 25 November 1973

The vice president of Greece was a senior administration position which existed during the republican phase of the Regime of the Colonels in 1973.

== Background ==
After the coup d'état of 21 April 1967, the Hellenic Parliament was dissolved and the nation was ruled by a series of far-right military juntas for the next seven years. Colonel Georgios Papadopoulos, the self-appointed Regent of Greece, abolished the Greek monarchy in June 1973 and declared himself President. Along with the new office of president, the office of vice president was also established and General Odysseas Angelis, then Chief of the Armed Forces, was chosen to occupy the seat.

== Selection and duties ==
The Greek Vice Presidency was seemingly modeled on its American counterpart; the Vice President was to be elected as the running mate of the President (Article 31) and their primary function was to serve as a successor to the presidency if the president died or resigned. The role Vice President played in the executive branch was vaguely defined, to the point that they only had the right to attend cabinet meetings if the President allowed them to. Unlike the American Vice President, however, the Greek Vice President did not serve as president of the Greek Senate, since the Constitution of 1973 kept the Hellenic Parliament in its traditional unicameral structure. Nor was there any mechanism to fill a Vice Presidential vacancy, unlike the American 25th Amendment; if the Vice Presidency was vacant, the President of the Hellenic Parliament would have become President of the Republic for the rest of the term.

Unlike the President, who was to be sworn (under conditions of full implementation of the constitution) in the presence of the outgoing President, the President of the Hellenic Parliament, part of the plenum of the Hellenic Parliament and of the Holy Synod of the Church of Greece, the Vice President would take the oath only before the President of the Republic and an administering member of the clergy.

This formal distinction highlights the role and duties of the Vice President of the Republic: the position was not created to serve as a leadership office, but rather as a post that assists (as per Article 38 of the 1973 Constitution) the President of the Republic, with limited powers.

== Aftermath ==
After less than six months, the Papadopoulos regime was ousted by hardliner Brigadier Dimitrios Ioannidis, who installed General Phaedon Gizikis as the new (figurehead and not executive) president. The office of vice president, however, was abolished by a Constituent Act together with the presidential provisions of the 1973 Constitution following the regime change, and thus Angelis remains to date the only holder of the office of Vice President of Greece.

== See also ==
- Deputy Prime Minister of Greece
