= Dimitrios Ioannidis =

Greek military dictator (1923–2010)

- Δημήτριος Ιωαννίδης
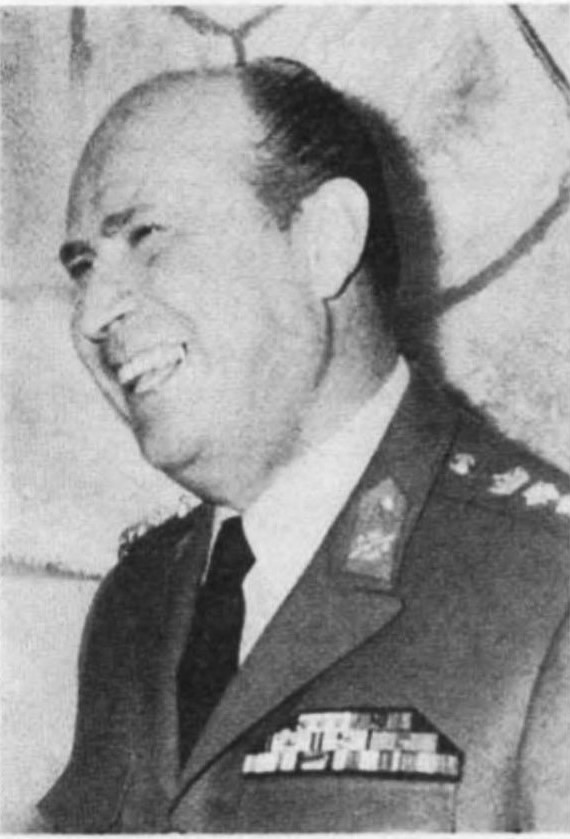
- Ioannidis as a Colonel
- Born: 13 March 1923; Athens, Kingdom of Greece
- Died: 16 August 2010 (aged 87); Nikaia, Attica, Greece
- Education: Hellenic Military Academy
- Military career
- Allegiance: Kingdom of Greece; Greek junta
- Branch: Hellenic Army; EDES
- Rank: Brigadier (stripped)
- Nicknames: The invisible dictator (ο αόρατος δικτάτωρ, o aóratos diktátōr)
- Commands: ESA
- Wars: World War II; Greco-Italian War; Battle of Greece; Greek Resistance; Greek Civil War
- Awards: Cross of Valour
- Criminal information
- Status: Deceased
- Criminal charges: Joint participation of High treason (Article 134 of the 1950 Penal Code) & Mutiny (Article 63 of the 1941 Military Penal Code) (Coup d' etat); Instigation of 7 premeditated murders, instigation of 38 attempted murders, incitement to commit felonies. (Polytechnic)
- Penalty: Life imprisonment plus a Dishonorable discharge (Coup d' etat); Seven life sentences, a concurrent 25-year prison sentence plus permanent deprivation of political rights. (Polytechnic)

Details
- Date: 21 April 1967; 15 - 17 November 1973
- Imprisoned at: Korydallos Prison
- De facto leader: ← Georgios Papadopoulos; (Last holder) →

Dimitrios Ioannidis (Greek: Δημήτριος Ιωαννίδης [ðiˈmitri.os i.oaˈniðis]; 13 March 1923 – 16 August 2010), also known as Dimitris Ioannidis and as The Invisible Dictator, was a Greek military officer and one of the leading figures in the junta that ruled Greece from 1967 to 1974. For the last 10 months of the junta's rule, he was the de facto leader of the country though never holding a formal government post. Ioannidis was considered a "purist and a moralist, a type of Greek Gaddafi".

== Early life and education ==
Dimitrios Ioannidis was born on 13 March 1923 in Athens and came from a relatively wealthy family. He was descended from a family from Ioannina.

During the Axis occupation of Greece he was a member of the National Republican Greek League (EDES) resistance group. After the war he studied at the Hellenic Military Academy and complemented his military education by studying at the Infantry School, the War School, and the School of Atomic-Chemical-Biological Warfare. As an army officer he took part also in the Greek civil war.

Ioannidis had begun his career as an officer in Napoleon Zervas's guerrilla forces.

== Involvement in the military junta (1967-1974) ==
Ioannidis took an active part in planning and executing the coup d'état of 21 April 1967 (he was Director of the Hellenic Military Academy), but despite his great power he preferred to stay in the shadows, allowing George Papadopoulos to take the limelight. Ioannidis became chief of the Greek Military Police (ESA) which he developed into a feared paramilitary force of more than 20,000 men. The ESA men brutally hunted down and tortured political dissidents. They also became notorious for insulting their nominal superiors, the Generals of the Greek Army, who were generally royalist or republican and opposed to the junta leadership. His The Daily Telegraph obituary described Ioannidis as "the brutal head of military security during the Greek colonels' dictatorship" who "oversaw the creation of EAT/ESA, the special interrogation section of the military police, at whose headquarters opponents of the regime, both civilian and military, were systematically tortured."

He was promoted to colonel in 1970, during which he would oppose Papadopoulos's efforts to democratize, and to brigadier general later in 1973.

At a time when democratization seemed imminent, the Athens Polytechnic uprising of November 1973 was met with bloody suppression. Ioannidis, the most hardline of hardliners, became enraged with the "liberalizing" tendencies of the Papadopoulos leadership and hatched a plot to overthrow him using his loyal ESA forces. On the night of 25 November 1973, Ioannidis overthrew Papadopoulos in a successful and bloodless coup. Papadopoulos was arrested by the loyalists of Ioannidis in his opulent seaside villa at Lagonissi. This was the second successful coup d'etat by Ioannidis, following the original of April 1967 which had abolished democracy. Ioannidis proceeded to install his friend Phaedon Gizikis as figurehead President of Greece, although total power belonged to him. He did not control the higher military hierarchy completely, but he could impose his will on them with the support of the lower ranks nicknamed "the small junta" (Ta Paraskinia tis Allagis-Stavros Psicharis-1975). This new balance of power granted him the moniker of the Invisible Dictator.

Ioannidis pursued a crackdown internally and an aggressive expansionism externally. He was determined to annex Cyprus to Greece and achieve Enosis. He also felt a bitter personal antipathy towards the President of Cyprus, Archbishop Makarios III, considering him opportunistic and communistic. He called him the "Red Priest". This antipathy was further fueled by the bishop rejecting actions against Turkish Cypriots. To that end, he organized the 15 July 1974 coup d'état in Cyprus (his last chance to do so since Makarios decided to expel all Greek officers from Cyprus by July 20) which overthrew Makarios. This was the third successful coup organized by Ioannidis, and at first things seemed to go along according to plan. Ioannidis installed journalist and EOKA militant Nikos Sampson as puppet president as a prelude to enosis (union) with Greece.

While in power, Ioannidis would regularly place conditions on all discussions with the U.S. embassy as noted by then ambassador Henry Tasca, despite maintaining publicly support for NATO due to his anti-communist stance.

When he did not manage to appoint the President of the Supreme Court and an ex-minister Zenon Severis, he tried to show to the outside world that the Cypriot coup was merely an internal affair, but this effort went without any success. However, the coup provided the pretext for the Turkish invasion of the island on 20 July, which ultimately restored Makarios to the presidency (and was the prelude to the island's current, divided state). Ioannidis could not survive such a humiliation, and was pushed out by the "coup of the generals" in August, headed by then Prime Minister Konstantinos Karamanlis, ending seven years of military rule.

== Trial and imprisonment ==
On 14 January 1975, Ioannidis was detained and tried on charges of high treason, rebellion, and of being an accessory to the manslaughters perpetrated during the Athens Polytechnic uprising. The trial ended after less than a month of testimony and deliberation. He received a life sentence, for the charge of treason, which he served at Korydallos Prison.

While in prison he would claim that he was betrayed by American military leaders who he alleges had promised him assistance in dealing with Turkey.

On 21 July 2007, the 84-year-old Ioannidis filed a request to be discharged for health reasons, which was subsequently denied. Imprisoned until his death, he got married in prison.

Ioannidis died of hyperthermia, at General Hospital of Nikaia Agios Panteleimon, on 16 August 2010, at age 87. He had been imprisoned for 35 years.

== External reference ==
- "loannidis: [sic] Power in the Wings", Time, 10 December 1973.
