= Odysseas Angelis =

Greek military officer (1912–1987)

- Οδυσσέας Αγγελής
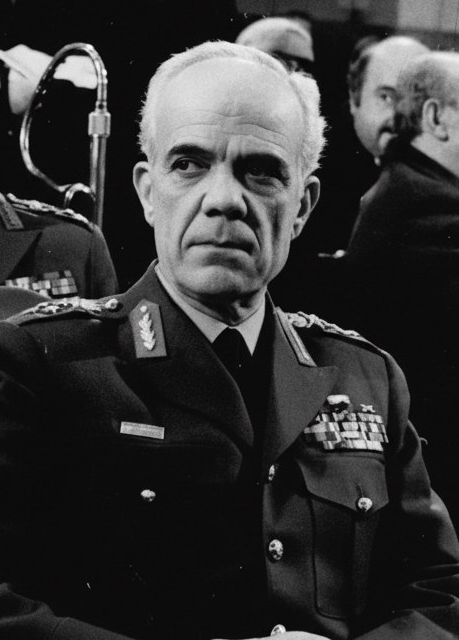
- Angelis in 1972

Vice President of Greece
- In office August 16, 1973 – November 25, 1973
- President: Georgios Papadopoulos
- Preceded by: Position established
- Succeeded by: Position abolished

Personal details
- Born: 12 February 1912 Drosia Anthidonos, Euboea, Greece
- Died: 22 March 1987 (aged 75) Korydallos Prison, Greece
- Education: Hellenic Military Academy
- Criminal information
- Status: Deceased
- Criminal charges: Joint perpetration of High treason (Article 134 of the 1950 Penal Code) & Mutiny (Article 63 of the 1941 Military Penal Code)
- Penalty: 20 years incarceration plus a Dishonorable discharge

Details
- Date: 21 April 1967
- Imprisoned at: Korydallos Prison
- Awards: Gold Cross of Valour

Military service
- Allegiance: Kingdom of Greece; (Greek junta, 1967-1973)
- Branch/service: Hellenic Army
- Years of service: 1934-1973
- Rank: General (stripped)
- Commands: Chief of the Armed Forces Headquarters; Chief of Staff of ASDEN; Chief of the Hellenic Army General Staff
- Battles/wars: World War II; Greco-Italian War; Battle of Greece; North African campaign; Greek Civil War

Odysseas Angelis (Greek: Οδυσσεύς Αγγελής; 12 February 1912 – 22 March 1987) was a Greek artillery officer. He reached the rank of four star General and served as Chief of the Greek Armed Forces and Vice President of the Hellenic Republic. He supported the military regime that was established on April 21, 1967.

He was imprisoned for his participation in the junta government after its fall. He committed suicide by hanging on March 22, 1987, in Korydallos Prison, cell no 48, where he was serving sentence.

== Biography ==
=== Early career ===
Angelis was born in the village of Steni on the island of Euboea in 1912. After completing his studies at the Hellenic Army Academy, he was sworn in as an artillery second lieutenant on 2 August 1934. Promoted to lieutenant in 1937 and captain in 1940, he participated in the Greco-Italian War as a mountain artillery battery commander. Following the German invasion and the Axis occupation of Greece, in 1943 Angelis fled the country and joined the Greek Armed Forces in the Middle East, where he commanded an anti-aircraft battery.

After the liberation of Greece he was promoted to major in 1946, and fought in the Greek Civil War in 1948 and 1949 as an artillery battalion commander. After the end of the civil war, he served in various artillery commands and completed courses at the Superior War School and the National Defence School. He served in the NATO headquarters at İzmir, as aide-de-camp to King Paul, professor at the Superior War School, chief of staff of the 9th Infantry Division, commandant of the Artillery School, director of the 2nd Staff Bureau at the Hellenic Army General Staff, chief of staff of ASDEN, and deputy commander and commander of the 5th Infantry Division. He was promoted to lieutenant colonel in 1950, colonel in 1958, brigadier in 1960, and major general in 1965.

In 1967 he was promoted to lieutenant general and deputy chief of the Hellenic National Defence General Staff, a post he held at the time of the coup d'état of 21 April 1967.

=== Under the Papadopoulos Dictatorship ===
After the establishment of the military regime, he was appointed Chief of the Army General Staff on 22 April 1967. He was responsible, at least officially, for the Army Decree Nr. 13, which banned the musical works of Mikis Theodorakis. On 21 April 1967 Angelis passed a series of laws limiting protest, including a ban on public gatherings of more than five people, a ban on all private gatherings of a political nature, a ban on propaganda against the generals and a ban on civilians holding guns.

During the failed royal counter-coup of 13 December 1967, Angelis remained loyal to Papadopoulos, and assumed, in addition to his post as head of the army, the position of Chief of the Hellenic National Defence General Staff. On 19 December 1968, he assumed command of the newly formed Armed Forces Headquarters (Αρχηγείο Ενόπλων Δυνάμεων). He was promoted to full General in 1970, and retired from the army on 16 August 1973.

Personally loyal to Georgios Papadopoulos, Angelis was chosen by the latter as his vice president during the planned transition to democratisation. Greece was declared a presidential republic on the first of June 1973 and, following a referendum which took place on 29 July 1973, Papadopoulos got sworn in as president and Angelis as vice president. Angelis served in this post until 25 November 1973, when Papadopoulos lost power to a hardliner coup.

=== Trial and imprisonment ===
Following the restoration of democratic rule in 1974, in the 1975 Junta Trials, he was sentenced to 20 years' imprisonment for high treason and mutiny. Angelis committed suicide in his cell in the Korydallos Prison on 22 March 1987.

== Sources ==
- Συνοπτική Ιστορία του Γενικού Επιτελείου Στρατού 1901–2001 [A Concise History of the Hellenic Army General Staff 1901–2001] (in Greek). Athens: Hellenic Army History Directorate. 2001. ISBN 960-7897-44-7.
