= Georgios Papadopoulos =

Dictator of Greece from 1967 to 1973

- Γεώργιος Παπαδόπουλος
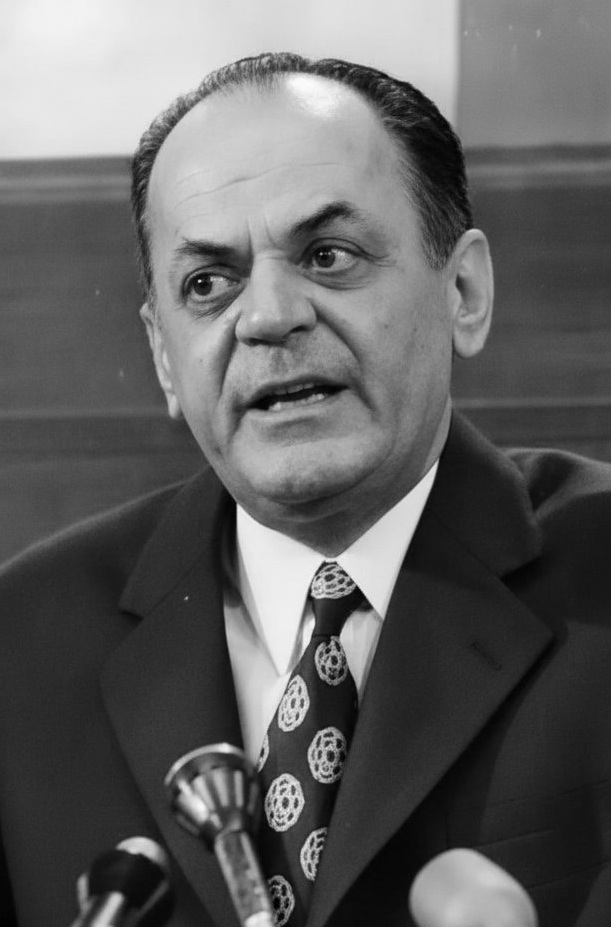
- Papadopoulos in 1973

President of Greece
- In office 1 June 1973 – 25 November 1973
- Prime Minister: Himself (Jun–Oct 1973); Spyros Markezinis (Oct–Nov 1973)
- Vice President: Vacant (Jun–Aug 1973); Odysseas Angelis (Aug–Nov 1973)
- Preceded by: Constantine II (as King)
- Succeeded by: Phaedon Gizikis

Prime Minister of Greece
- In office 13 December 1967 – 8 October 1973
- Monarch: Constantine II (1967–1973)
- President: Himself (1973)
- Deputy: Stylianos Pattakos; Dimitrios Patilis (1968–1970); Nikolaos Makarezos (1971–1973)
- Preceded by: Konstantinos Kollias
- Succeeded by: Spyros Markezinis

Regent of Greece
- In office 21 March 1972 – 1 June 1973
- Monarch: Constantine II
- Preceded by: Georgios Zoitakis
- Succeeded by: Position abolished

Minister at the Presidency of the Government of Greece
- In office 21 April 1967 – 8 October 1973
- Prime Minister: Konstantinos Kollias (Apr–Dec 1967); Himself (1967–1973)
- Preceded by: Grigorios Kasimatis
- Succeeded by: Georgios Rallis (1975)

Minister for Foreign Affairs of Greece
- In office 21 July 1970 – 8 October 1973
- Prime Minister: Himself
- Preceded by: Panagiotis Pipinelis
- Succeeded by: Christos Xanthopoulos-Palamas

Minister for National Defence of Greece
- In office 13 December 1967 – 8 October 1973
- Prime Minister: Himself
- Preceded by: Grigorios Spandidakis
- Succeeded by: Nikolaos Efesios

Minister of National Education and Religious Affairs of Greece
- In office 20 June 1969 – 21 July 1970
- Prime Minister: Himself
- Preceded by: Theofylaktos Papakonstantinou
- Succeeded by: Nikitas Sioris

Personal details
- Born: 5 May 1919 Elaiochori, Achaea, Kingdom of Greece
- Died: 27 June 1999 (aged 80) Laiko General Hospital, Athens, Greece
- Resting place: First Cemetery of Athens
- Citizenship: Greece
- Party: Independent (until 1973)
- Other political affiliations: National Political Union (1984–1990)
- Spouses: Niki Vasileiadi (m. 1942; div. 1969); Despina Sereti (m. 1970)
- Children: 3
- Relatives: Konstantinos Papadopoulos (brother)
- Education: Hellenic Military Academy; National Technical University of Athens (attended)
- Occupation: Military officer; politician; dictator
- Civilian awards: Order of the Redeemer; Order of Honour; Order of George I

Military service
- Allegiance: Kingdom of Greece (1937–1941, 1944–1967); (Hellenic State (1941–1944)) Hellenic State (1941–1944)
- Branch/service: Hellenic Army; Artillery
- Years of service: 1937–1967
- Rank: Brigadier
- Unit: I Army Corps
- Battles/wars: World War II; Greco-Italian War; Battle of Greece; Greek resistance; Dekemvriana; Greek Civil War; 1967 Greek coup d'état
- Military awards: Cross of Valour; War Cross (6); Medal for Outstanding Acts; Medal of Military Merit; Campaign medal
- Criminal information
- Status: Deceased
- Criminal charges: High treason; Mutiny; Aiding and abetting
- De facto leader: ← (First holder); Dimitrios Ioannidis →

Georgios Papadopoulos (Greek: Γεώργιος Παπαδόπουλος, pronounced [ʝeˈorʝi.os papaˈðopulos]; 5 May 1919 – 27 June 1999) was a Greek military officer and dictator who ruled Greece from 1967 to 1973. He led the military junta that overthrew Prime Minister Panagiotis Kanellopoulos in 1967 and established his dictatorship. He was proclaimed Prime Minister of Greece from 1967 and served until 1973. He was elected President of Greece under the junta in June 1973, following a referendum. However, after causing a massacre by deploying military riflemen and a tank brigade to attack non-violent protestors to suppress the Athens Polytechnic uprising, he was overthrown by hardliner Dimitrios Ioannidis, in a string of events that would culminate in the fall of regime in 1974. His dictatorship's legacy, as well as its methods he constructed and effects on Greek economy and society as a whole, are still fiercely debated.

He joined the Hellenic Army during the Second World War and initially helped resist the Italian invasion of Greece in the Greco-Italian War. He is widely believed to have later collaborated as a member of the Axis-aligned Security Battalions. After the war, he rose to the rank of colonel.

In April 1967, Papadopoulos and a group of other mid-level Army officers overthrew the democratic government and established a military junta that lasted until 1974. Assuming dictatorial powers, he led an authoritarian, anti-communist and ultranationalist regime which eventually ended the Greek monarchy and established a republic, with himself as President. In 1973, he was overthrown and arrested by his co-conspirator Brigadier General Dimitrios Ioannidis. After the Metapolitefsi which restored democracy in 1974, Papadopoulos was tried for his part in the crimes of the junta and sentenced to death, but his sentence was commuted to life imprisonment. Refusing several offers of clemency in exchange for admitting guilt, he spent the remainder of his life in prison.

== Early life and military career ==
Georgios Papadopoulos was born on 5 May 1919 in Elaiohori, a small village in the Prefecture of Achaea in the Peloponnese, to local schoolteacher Christos Papadopoulos and his wife Chrysoula. He was the eldest son and had two brothers, Konstantinos and Haralambos. After finishing high school in 1937, he enrolled in the Hellenic Military Academy, completing its three-year programme in 1940.

His biographical notes, published as a booklet by his supporters in 1980, mention that he took a civil engineering course at the Polytechneion but did not graduate.

=== Resistance and acquiescence ===
During the Second World War, Papadopoulos saw field action as an artillery second lieutenant against both Italian and Nazi German forces that attacked Greece on 6 April 1941.

Papadopoulos is believed by most historians to have later become a member of the collaborationist Security Battalions in Patras under the command of Colonel Kourkoulakos, which "hunted down" Greek resistance fighters. This is contested by Greek historians Evanthis Hatzivassiliou and Leonidas F. Kallivretakis. According to Kallivretakis, during the Axis occupation of Greece, Papadopoulos worked in the Greek administration’s Patras office. It has also been argued that Papadopoulos, at the end of the Axis occupation of Greece, entered Organisation X, but Kallivretakis considers that this information has not been proven.

Along with other right-wing military officers, he participated in the creation of the nationalist right-wing secret IDEA organisation in the autumn of 1944, shortly after the country's liberation. Those 1940 officers who took refuge in the Kingdom of Egypt along with King Geórgios II immediately after the German invasion, had become generals when their still-colonel former classmates undertook the coup of 1967.

== Post-Second World War career ==
During the Greek Civil War, Papadopoulos was promoted to captain in 1946, and promoted to major in 1949. He served in the KYP Intelligence Service from 1959 to 1964 as the main contact between the KYP and the top CIA operative in Greece, John Fatseas, after training at the CIA in 1953.

=== The Beloyannis trials ===
Papadopoulos was also a member of the court-martial in the first trial of Greek communist leader Nikos Beloyannis, in 1951. At that trial, Beloyannis was sentenced to death for the crime of being a member of the Communist Party of Greece (KKE), which was banned following the Greek Civil War. The death sentence was not carried out, but Beloyannis was put on trial again in early 1952, this time for alleged espionage, following the discovery of radio transmitters used by undercover Greek communists to communicate with the exiled leadership of the Party in the Soviet Union. At the end of this trial, he was sentenced to death and immediately taken out and shot. Papadopoulos was not involved in this second trial.

=== Rise to colonel in the 1960s ===
In 1964, Papadopoulos was transferred to an artillery division in Western Thrace by a decree of Defense Minister Garoufalias, a member of the Centre Union (EK). In June 1965, days before the onset of the major political turmoil known as Iouliana, he made national headlines after arresting two soldiers under his command and eight leftist civilians from settlements near his military camp, on charges that they had conspired to sabotage army vehicles by pouring sugar into the vehicles' petrol tanks. The ten were imprisoned and tortured, but it was eventually proven that Papadopoulos himself had sabotaged the vehicles. Andreas Papandreou wrote in his memoirs that Papadopoulos wanted to prove that under the Centre Union government, the Communists had been left free to undermine national security. Even after this scandal, Papadopoulos was not discharged from the army since the Prime Minister, Geórgios Papandreou, forgave him as a compatriot of his father. In 1967, Papadopoulos was promoted to colonel.

== 21 April 1967: Coup d'état ==
That same year, on 21 April, a month before the general elections, Colonel Papadopoulos, along with fellow middle-ranking Army officers, led a successful coup, taking advantage of the volatile political situation that had arisen from a conflict between the young King Constantine II and the popular former prime minister, Geórgios Papandreou. Papadopoulos used his power gained from the coup to try to place Papandreou under house arrest and re-engineer the Greek political landscape rightward. Papadopoulos, along with the other junta members, are known in Greece by the term Aprilianoi ('Aprilians'), denoting the month of the coup. The term Aprilianoi has become synonymous with the term "dictators of 1967–1974".

=== Regime of the Colonels ===
King Constantine appointed a new government nominally headed by Konstantinos Kollias. However, from the early stages, Papadopoulos was the strongman of the new regime. He was appointed Minister of National Defense and Minister of the Presidency in the Kollias government, and his position was further enhanced after the King's abortive counter-coup on 13 December, when Papadopoulos replaced Kollias as Prime Minister. Not content with that, on 21 March 1972, he nominated himself Regent of Greece, succeeding General Geórgios Zoitakis. Torture of political prisoners in general, and communists in particular, was not out of the question. Examples included severe beatings, isolation and, according to some sources, pulling out fingernails.

=== "Patient in a cast" and other metaphors ===
Throughout his tenure as the junta strongman, Papadopoulos often employed what have been described by the BBC as gory surgical metaphors, where he or the junta assumed the role of the "medical doctor". The "patient" was Greece. Typically, Papadopoulos or the junta portrayed themselves as the "doctor" who operated on the "patient" by putting the patient's "foot" in an orthopedic cast and applying restraints on the "patient", tying him on a surgical bed and putting him under anesthesia to perform the "operation" so that the life of the "patient" would not be "endangered" during the operation. In one of his famous speeches, Papadopoulos mentioned:

"ευρισκόμεθα προ ενός ασθενούς, τον οποίον έχομεν επί χειρουργικής κλίνης, και τον οποίον εάν ο χειρουργός δεν προσδέση κατά την διάρκειαν της εγχειρήσεως και της ναρκώσεως επί της χειρουργικής κλίνης, υπαρχει πιθανότης αντί δια της εγχειρήσεως να του χαρίσει την αποκατάστασιν της υγείας, να τον οδηγήσει εις θάνατον. [...] Οι περιορισμοί είναι η πρόσδεσις του ασθενούς επί κλίνης δια να υποστή ακινδύνως την εγχείρισιν

Translated as:

“...We are in front of a patient, whom we have on a surgical bed, and whom if the surgeon does not strap on the surgical bed during the time of the surgery and the anesthesia, there is a chance instead of the surgery granting him the restoration of his health, to lead him to his death [...] The restrictions are the straps, keeping the patient tied to the surgical bed so that he will undergo the surgery without danger.

In the same speech Papadopoulos continued:

"Ασθενή έχομεν. Εις τον γύψον τον εβάλαμεν. Τον δοκιμάζομεν εάν ημπορεί να περπατάει χωρίς τον γύψον. Σπάζομεν τον αρχικόν γύψον και ξαναβάζομεν ενδεχομένως τον καινούργιο εκεί όπου χρειάζεται Το Δημοψήφισμα θα είναι μία γενική θεώρησις των ικανοτήτων του ασθενούς. Ας προσευχηθώμεν να μη χρειάζεται ξανά γύψον. Εάν χρειάζεται, θα του τον βάλομεν. Και το μόνον που ημπορώ να σας υποσχεθώ, είναι να σας καλέσω να ειδήτε και σεις το πόδι χωρίς γύψον!

which translates as follows:

"We have a patient. We test him if he can walk without a plaster cast. We break the initial cast and, if warranted, we put another cast where is needed. The referendum will be a general overview of the capabilities of the patient. Let us pray that he may not need a cast again. If he needs one, we will put one on him. And the only thing I can promise you, is to invite you to see the foot without a cast!

Other metaphors contained religious imagery related to the resurrection of Christ at Easter: "Χριστός Ανέστη – Ελλάς Ανέστη" translating as "Christ has risen – Greece has risen", alluding that the junta would "save" Greece and resurrect her into a greater, new Land. The theme of rebirth was used many times as a standard reply to avoid answering any questions as to how long the dictatorship would last:

Διότι αυτό το τελευταίον είναι υπόθεσις άλλων. Είναι υποθέσεις εκείνων, οι οποίοι έθεσαν την θρυαλλίδα εις την δυναμίτιδα δια την έκρηξιν προς αναγέννησιν της Πολιτείας την νύκτα της 21 Απριλίου.

Translated as:

Because the latter is someone else's concern. They are the concerns of those, who lit the fuse of the dynamite for the explosion which led to the rebirth of the State the night of 21 April 1967.

The religious themes and rebirth metaphors are also seen in the following:

Αι υποχρεώσεις μας περιγράφονται και από την θρησκείαν και από την ιστορίαν μας. Ομόνοιαν και αγάπην διδάσκει ο Χριστός. Πίστιν εις την Πατρίδα επιτάσσει η Ιστορία μας. [...] η Ελλάς αναγεννάται, η Ελλάς θα μεγαλουργήσει, η Ελλάς πάντα θα ζει.

Translated as:

Our obligations are described by both our history and our religion. Christ teaches Harmony and Love. Our history demands faith in our country. [...] Greece is being reborn, Greece will accomplish great things, Greece will live forever.

=== Assassination attempt ===
Alexandros Panagoulis on trial by the junta.

A failed assassination attempt against Papadopoulos was perpetrated by Alexandros Panagoulis in the morning of 13 August 1968, when Papadopoulos was driven from his summer residence in Lagonisi to Athens, escorted by his personal security motorcycles and cars. Panagoulis ignited a bomb at a point of the coastal road where the limousine carrying Papadopoulos would have to slow down, but the bomb failed to harm Papadopoulos. Panagoulis was captured a few hours later in a nearby sea cave, since the boat sent to help him escape was instructed to leave at a specific time and he could not swim there on time due to strong sea currents. After his arrest, he was taken to the Greek Military Police (EAT-ESA) offices where he was questioned, beaten and tortured. On 17 November 1968, Panagoulis was sentenced to death but was personally pardoned by Papadopoulos, served only five years in prison, and after democracy was restored was elected a member of Parliament. He was regarded as an emblematic figure of the struggle to restore democracy, and as such has often been paralleled to Harmodius and Aristogeiton, two ancient Athenians known for their assassination of Hipparchus, brother of the tyrant Hippias.

=== Normalisation and attempts at liberalisation ===
Our Credo by Geórgios Papadopoulos. It was a multi-volume collection of speeches, declarations, messages and other published material by the dictator.

Despite his heavy-handed rule, Papadopoulos was one of the more moderate members of the junta. He had indicated as early as 1968 that he was eager for reform. He had declared at the time that he did not want the Revolution of 21 April (as the coup was called by the junta's supporters) to become a 'regime'. Around the same time, he had reached out to some old-line politicians, such as Spyros Markezinis. Several attempts to liberalise the regime during 1969 and 1970 were thwarted by the hardliners on the junta, including Ioannides. In fact, subsequent to his 1970 failed attempt at reform, he threatened to resign and was dissuaded only after the hardliners renewed their personal allegiance to him.

As internal dissatisfaction grew in the early 1970s, and especially after an abortive coup by the Navy in early 1973, Papadopoulos attempted to legitimise the regime by beginning a gradual "democratisation" (see also the article on the Metapolitefsi). On 1 June 1973, he abolished the monarchy and declared Greece a republic with himself as president. He was confirmed in office via a controversial referendum. He furthermore sought the support of the old political establishment, but secured only the cooperation of Markezinis, who became prime minister. Concurrently, many restrictions were lifted and the army's role significantly reduced. An interim constitution created a presidential republic. The president would serve an eight-year term, and was vested with sweeping—almost dictatorial—powers. The decision to return to (at least nominal) civilian rule and the restriction of the army's role did not go nearly far enough for those who wanted full democracy. At the same time, this move was resented by many of the regime's supporters, whose dissatisfaction with Papadopoulos would become evident a few months later.

=== Ties to US intelligence ===
Papadopoulos is widely reported to have had certain ties to the Central Intelligence Agency, (Note: The extent of these ties as reported in the sources varies. See for example: Shadow Warrior: William Egan Colby and the CIA: "In 1967, a group of neo-fascist colonels had staged a coup and seized power in Greece. They installed George Papadopoulos, who had been on the CIA payroll off and on since the 1950s, as president."; Legacy of Ashes: The History of the CIA: "Most of it came from members and supporters of "the colonels"—the Greek junta that seized power in April 1967, led by George Papadopoulos, a recruited CIA agent since the days of Allen Dulles, and the KYP's liaison to the agency."; Dr. Andreas Constandinos again confirms in America, Britain and the Cyprus Crisis of 1974: Calculated Conspiracy or Foreign Policy Failure? that William Colby had admitted "the agency had 'worked with' George Papadopoulos in the Colonel's 'official capacity'".; Daniele Ganser in NATO's Secret Armies: Operation GLADIO and Terrorism in Western Europe: "The new ruler George Papadopoulos had operated as KYP's liaison officer with the CIA ever since 1952 and within the KYP was known to be the trusted man of CIA chief of station [Jack] Maury."; The Independent, in George Papadopoulos's Obituary: "Between 1959 and 1964 [Papadopoulos] served as a staff officer in the Greek Central Intelligence Agency (KYP), following a period in which it is claimed that he was trained by the CIA in the United States."; The Economist, in their Obituary post: "He had been attached to a Greek army intelligence unit that had links with the CIA."; Greek City Times, in Papadopoulos, a controversial Greek figure: From electrifying villages to betraying Cyprus: "April 21, 1967, will always be known as a day that forever changed Greek history when the military took over the government and installed CIA-connected Colonel Georgios Papadopoulos into power."; William Blum, in quote: "A CIA report dated 23 January 1967 had specifically named the Papadopoulos group as one plotting a coup, and was apparently one of the reports discussed at the February meeting. Of the cabal of five officers which took power in April, four, reportedly, were intimately connected to the American military or to the CIA in Greece. The fifth man had been brought in because of the armored units he commanded. George Papadopoulos emerged as the defacto leader, taking the title prime minister later in the year. The catchword amongst old hands at the US military mission in Greece was that Papadopoulos was "the first CIA agent to become Premier of a European country".") and has also been reported to have undergone military and intelligence training in the United States during the 1950s. On 1 July 1973, The Observer published an investigative journalism article that accused the Central Intelligence Agency (CIA) of engineering the 1967 coup, further writing that Papadopoulos was known among senior officials in the Joint United States Military Aid Assistance Group in Athens as "the first CIA agent to become Premier of a European country".

A day after the Observer article was published, during CIA agent William Colby's confirmation hearings to be Director of Central Intelligence, Colby was asked in response to the article if there was any justification for the assertions. Colby denied that the CIA had engineered the coup or that Papadopoulos was either a CIA agent or otherwise paid by the CIA, but stating that "[Papadopoulos] has been an official of the Greek Government at various times, and in those periods from time to time we worked with him in his official capacity.".

== Fall of the Papadopoulos regime ==
After the events of the student uprising of 17 November at the National Technical University of Athens (see Athens Polytechnic uprising), Papadopoulos was overthrown on 25 November 1973 by hardline elements in the Army. The outcry over Papadopoulos's extensive reliance on the army to quell the student uprising gave Brigadier Dimitrios Ioannidis a pretext to oust him and replace him as the new strongman of the regime. Papadopoulos was put under house arrest at his villa, while Greece returned to an "orthodox" military dictatorship.

After democracy was restored in 1974, during the period of Metapolitefsi ("regime change"), Papadopoulos and his cohorts were arrested and were eventually put on trial for high treason, mutiny, torture, and other crimes and misdemeanors.

On 23 August 1975, he and several others were found guilty and were sentenced to death, which was later commuted to life imprisonment.

== Personal life ==
In 1942, after 3 years of courtship and 6 months of engagement, he married Niki Vasileiadi (died 2015), originally from Ilion of Asia Minor. Together they had a son, Christos (b. 1943), a chemist, who lives in the United States and Chrysoula (1945–2004). In 1954, he met and entered into a relationship with Despina Sereti (née Gaspari) (1930–2023), an employee of the Hellenic Intelligence Service and the Geographical Service of the Greek Army, at the time Papadopoulos was posted to the Artillery Division of the VI Division, with the rank of Major. Together, they had a daughter out of wedlock, Hypermachia. Since then, he was estranged from Vasileiadi.

=== Divorce by decree rumors ===
The separation, however lengthy, could not lead to divorce at first because, under Greece's restrictive divorce laws of that era, spousal consent was required. It is claimed that, as a remedy to the issue, in 1970, as Prime Minister of the dictatorship, he decreed a custom-made divorce law with a strict time limit (and a built-in sunset clause) that enabled him to get the divorce. After having served its purpose, the law eventually expired automatically. Those reports are contradicted by a 1975 article by Makedonia, which claims that Vasiliadi had filed for divorce on 19 September 1969, with the divorce being granted by the Athens Court of First Instance on 27 October of the same year on "joint liability" grounds. Makedonia's claims are further corroborated by the failure of newer sources to provide the decree specifics (type, number, Efimeris tis Kyverniseos Issue number). Such rumors are baseless in the case of Papadopoulos' divorce, but in 1972 a bill that would allow divorces on the basis of long-term separation (featuring a built-in sunset clause) was put forward by the government, only to meet the opposition of the Church of Greece. Such a law (but without a sunset clause) came to be only in 1979, a decade after the divorce of Vasileiadi and Papadopoulos.

In March 1970, he married Gaspari, with whom he lived throughout the years of his separation from Vasileiadi. Gaspari, immediately after the wedding, informally assumed the role of First Lady of Greece, until his overthrow in November 1973. They remained married until his death.

== Death ==
His health had been failing by 1994, in Korydallos prison, as he was diagnosed with amyotrophic lateral sclerosis (ALS) and prostate cancer, which soon spread to all his organs. He showed no remorse and steadfastly refused to apply for parole or amnesty or to use the leniency provisions that allowed him to be released on the grounds of ill health, as did several of his associates, such as Pattakos, Makarezos, and Zoitakis. He had been hospitalized at Laiko General Hospital since August 1996 and by April 1999, due to a tracheotomy he had undergone, he was unable to speak and communicated only through notes. He died of a heart attack in the intensive care unit, on 27 June 1999, at age 80. He was buried at the First Cemetery of Athens on 1 July 1999, in the presence of old associates and regime sympathisers.

== Legacy ==
Today, Papadopoulos is a symbol of authoritarianism and xenophobia. After the restoration of democracy, some support for his type of politics remained which was, for a time, bolstered by the National Political Union (EPEN), a small political party that declared him its honorary leader. The EPEN eventually dissolved, with supporters scattering to various other political parties such as the Popular Orthodox Rally (LAOS) and criminal organisations like Golden Dawn (XA).

== See also ==
- History of modern Greece
- Military history of Greece during World War II

== Notes ==
Political offices
Preceded by Konstantinos Kollias	Prime Minister of Greece; 13 December 1967 – 8 October 1973	Succeeded by Spyros Markezinis
Preceded by Grigorios Spandidakis	Minister for National Defence; 13 December 1967 – 8 October 1973	Succeeded by Nikolaos Efessios
Preceded by Georgios Zoitakis	Regent of Greece; 1972–1973	Monarchy abolished
Government offices
New title Monarchy abolished	President of Greece; 1973	Succeeded by Phaedon Gizikis
