= De facto leader of Greece (1967–1974) =

De facto leader of Greece during the period of the Regime of the Colonels

De facto leader Head of the Military Junta Junta leader
- Emblems of Greece

- Flags of Greece

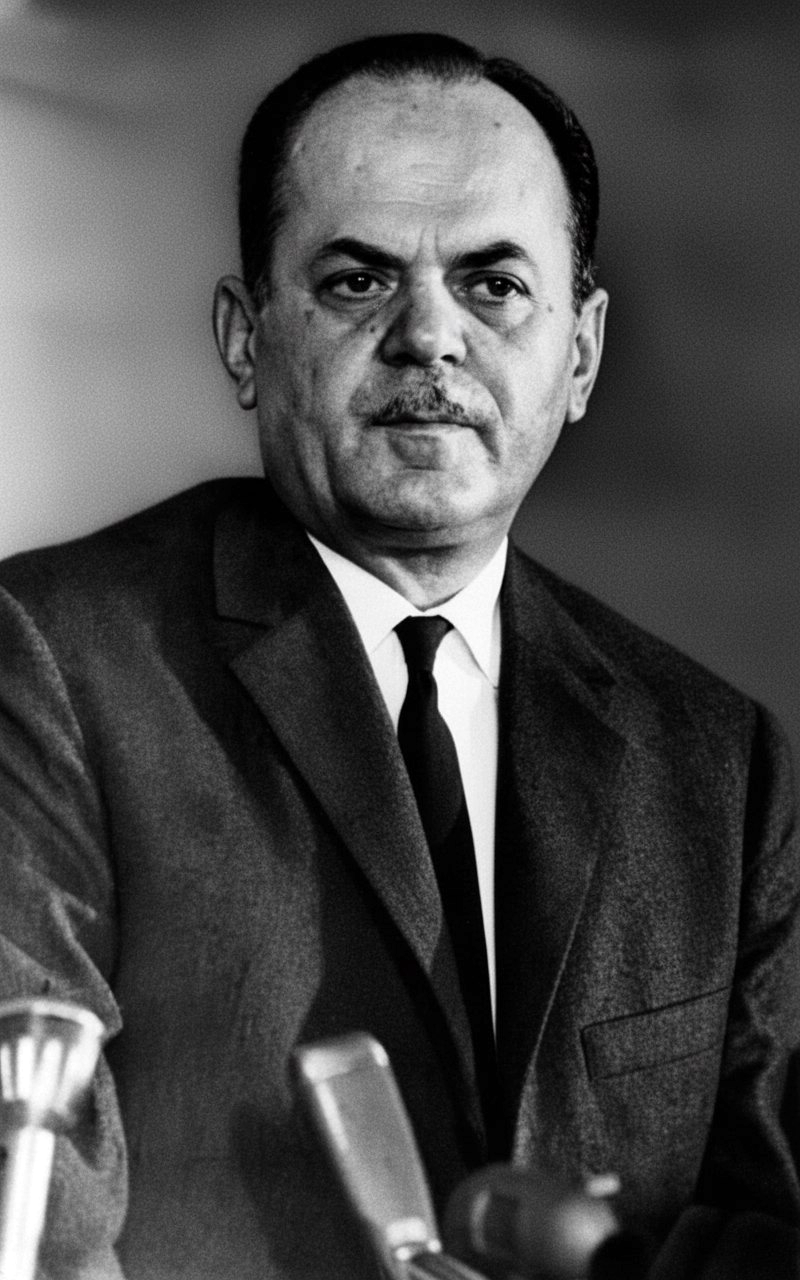
- Longest officeholder Georgios Papadopoulos; 21 April 1967 – 25 November 1973
- Formation: April 21, 1967; 59 years ago
- Abolished: July 24, 1974; 52 years ago

The De facto leader or also known as the Head of the Military Junta or just Junta leader was the highest position within the Greek junta which controlled the Kingdom of Greece (1967–1973) and the Helenic Republic (1973–1974)

== List ==
No.	Portrait	Name Native name (Birth–Death)	Term of office			Party	References
No.	Portrait	Name Native name (Birth–Death)	Took office	Left office	Time in office	Party	References
Kingdom of Greece (1967–1973)
1		Georgios Papadopoulos; Γεώργιος Παπαδόπουλος (1919–1999)	21 April 1967	1 June 1973	6 years, 41 days	Military	
Hellenic Republic (1973–1974)
(1)		Georgios Papadopoulos; Γεώργιος Παπαδόπουλος (1919–1999)	1 June 1973	25 November 1973	177 days	Military	
2		Dimitrios Ioannidis; Δημήτριος Ιωαννίδης (1923–2010)	25 November 1973	24 July 1974	241 days	Military	

== See also ==
- Duce
- Führer
- Poglavnik
- Conducător
- Supreme Leader (North Korean title)
- Supreme Leader of Democratic Kampuchea
