= List of regents of Greece =

This is a list of regents (Greek: αντιβασιλείς, sing. αντιβασιλεύς) in the modern Kingdom of Greece (1832–1924 and 1935–1973). A regent, from the Latin regens "one who reigns", is a person selected to act as head of state (ruling or not) because the ruler is a minor, not present, or debilitated.

== Reign of Otto ==
Image	Name	Regency start	Regency end
Regency Council during the minority of King Otto.
	First Regency Council: Josef Ludwig von Armansperg, Carl Wilhelm von Heideck, Georg Ludwig von Maurer	6 February 1833	21 July 1834; Heideck and Maurer replaced.
	Second Regency Council: Josef Ludwig von Armansperg, Egid von Kobell, Johann Baptist von Greiner	21 July 1834	1 June 1835; King Otto's majority.

Following their marriage in 1836, during Otto's illnesses and absences from the capital, Queen Amalia undertook the duties of a regent.

== Reign of George I ==
Image	Name	Regency start	Regency end
Regent due to George I out of the country on a tour of Europe.
	Prince Johann of Schleswig-Holstein-Sonderburg-Glücksburg	March 1867	November 1867; Return of George I.

== Reign of Alexander I ==
Image	Name	Regency start	Regency end
Regent after the death of Alexander. Resigned following the electoral defeat of the Venizelists.
	Pavlos Kountouriotis	28 October 1920	17 November 1920; Resigned.
Regent until the return of Constantine I.
	Queen Olga, The Queen Mother	17 November 1920	19 December 1920; Referendum.

== First reign of George II ==
Image	Name	Regency start	Regency end
Regent due to the departure of George II from the country pending a referendum on the abolition of the monarchy.
	Pavlos Kountouriotis	20 December 1923	25 March 1924; Abolition of the monarchy by the National Assembly; Continued in office as head of state and elected as President of Greece on 24 May.

== Second reign of George II ==
Image	Name	Regency start	Regency end
Regent from the coup d'état of 10 October 1935 that abolished the Second Hellenic Republic until George II's arrival in Greece.
	Georgios Kondylis	10 October 1935	22 November 1935; Concurrently in office as Prime Minister, until 30 November.
Regent from the Dekemvriana until the 1946 plebiscite on the monarchy.
	Archbishop Damaskinos of Athens	31 December 1944	27 September 1946

== Reign of Paul I ==
Image	Name	Regency start	Regency end
Regent due to Paul I recovering from an operation.
	Crown Prince Constantine	20 February 1964	6 March 1964; King Paul died.

== Reign of Constantine II ==
Image	Name	Regency start	Regency end
Regent due to Constantine II's self-exile after the failed 13 December 1967 counter-coup against the military junta.
	Georgios Zoitakis	13 December 1967	21 March 1972; Dismissed and replaced by junta strongman Georgios Papadopoulos.
	Georgios Papadopoulos	21 March 1972	1 June 1973, Self-appointed as President of Greece, following the abortive Navy mutiny of 25 May.

== See also ==
- Regency
- List of regents
- List of heads of state of Greece
- President of Greece
- Prime Minister of Greece
  - List of prime ministers of Greece
- Monarchy of Greece
  - List of kings of Greece
