= Petros Garoufalias =

Greek politician and businessman

Petros Garoufalias (Greek: Πέτρος Γαρουφαλιάς, 1901 – September 17, 1984) was a Greek politician and businessman, and President of the Fix Beer Company. He was a major financial backer of Prime Minister Georgios Papandreou, under whom he served as Minister of Defense. However, he was heavily involved in the events known as the "Iouliana" of 1965, which led to the fall of the Center Union government.

== Life ==
Born in Arta in 1901, Garoufalias came from a prominent family of the Arta region; his ancestor Nikolaos Garoufalias was a member of Filiki Eteria and had fought in the Greek War of Independence in the 1820s. His father, Evangelos Garoufalias, had served as Mayor of Arta and as Member of Parliament.

Garoufalias graduated from the Law School of Athens University and earned post-graduate degrees in Commercial Law and Economics in Berlin and Paris.

He served as a Member of Parliament for Arta Prefecture, and was closely associated with Georgios Papandreou. With Papandreou's help, Garoufalias was named Minister of Public Order, Minister of the Interior and Deputy Minister of National Economy (Coordination) in the centrist governments of 1950–52, under Prime Ministers Nikolaos Plastiras and Sophoklis Venizelos (Papandreou himself was Deputy Prime Minister).

He married Marianthi Fix, widow of industrialist Ioannis Fix, and thus inherited the Fix Beer Company. George Papandreou was best man at the wedding.

Garoufalias was named Greek Minister of Defense in the third Papandreou government, from February 1964 to July 1965. He clashed with the Prime Minister's son, Andreas Papandreou (also a minister in the government) over the control of the Greek military; Garoufalias took the side of the King in the events known as the "Iouliana of 1965", which contributed to the downfall of the government, a deep political crisis and, eventually, to the imposition of the dictatorial Regime of the Colonels.

In his 1982 book "Greece and Cyprus: Tragic Mistakes, Lost Opportunities, February 19, 1964 – July 15, 1965", Garoufalias claimed that the Greek Army division that was secretly dispatched to Cyprus in 1964 was his idea, an opinion vociferously rejected by Andreas Papandreou, who maintained that Garoufalias's role on Cyprus was very limited, and that he merely followed orders, without even being invited to the most important meetings.

Garoufalias died on September 17, 1984, aged 83.
