= Life imprisonment in Greece =

Life imprisonment is legal under the Greek penal code, and is the most severe punishment available under the law. It can be imposed for multiple murders, mass murder, treason, terrorism, aircraft hijacking, and aggravated hostage taking. Such life sentence is mandatory for multiple murders and any act of terrorism, including aircraft hijacking. For a single life sentence, an inmate can become eligible for parole after serving 16 years. For those who receive multiple life sentences, parole eligibility can begin after 20 years. Parole is not mandatory, and if rejected, the inmate can reapply every 2 years until they are released or die. There are an average of 25 life sentences per year.

The President of Greece can pardon the inmate anytime. For those under the age of 18, the maximum sentence is 20 years' imprisonment.
