= Prime Minister of Greece =

Head of government

Prime Minister of the Hellenic Republic
- Πρωθυπουργός της Ελληνικής Δημοκρατίας
- Coat of arms of the Greek Government

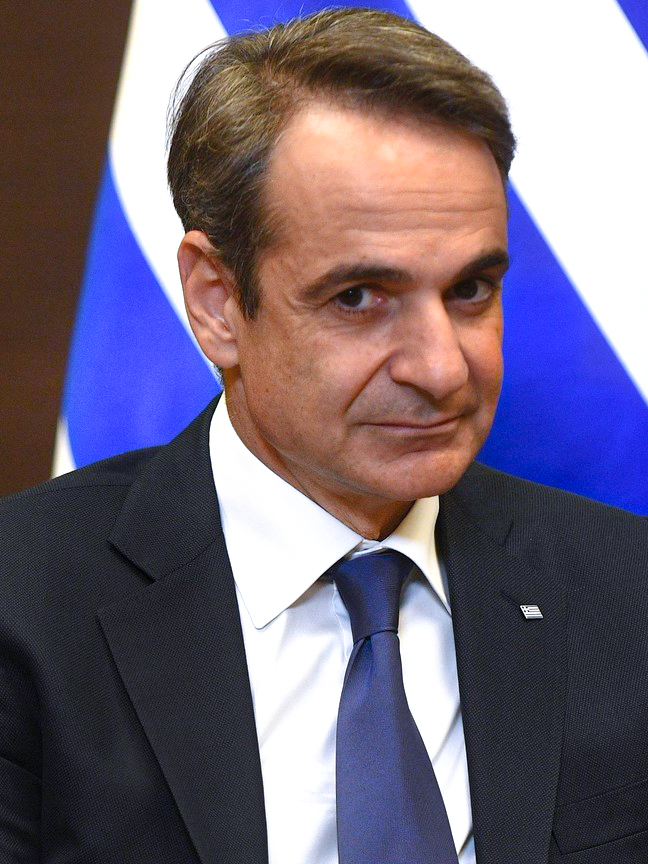
- Incumbent; Kyriakos Mitsotakis since 26 June 2023
- Government of Greece
- Style: His Excellency (formal and diplomatic); Mr Prime Minister (informal)
- Status: Head of government
- Member of: Cabinet; Government Council for Foreign Affairs and Defence; Parliament; European Council
- Reports to: Parliament; President
- Residence: Maximos Mansion
- Appointer: President of Greece
- Term length: Four years, renewable
- Inaugural holder: Spyridon Trikoupis
- Formation: 13 January 1822; 204 years ago
- Deputy: Deputy Prime Minister
- Salary: €99,420 annually
- Website: www.primeminister.gr

The prime minister of the Hellenic Republic (Greek: Πρωθυπουργός της Ελληνικής Δημοκρατίας, romanized: Prothypourgós tis Ellinikís Dimokratías), usually referred to as the prime minister of Greece (Πρωθυπουργός της Ελλάδας, Prothypourgós tis Elládas), is the head of government of the Hellenic Republic and the leader of the Greek Cabinet.

The officeholder's official seat (but not residence) is the Maximos Mansion in the centre of Athens. After the Presidency of the Government (Προεδρία της Κυβερνήσεως, Proedría tis Kyverníseos) was established, the office is referred to either as Prime Minister or President of the Government (Πρόεδρος της Κυβερνήσεως, Próedros tis Kyverníseos).

== Election and appointment of the prime minister ==
The prime minister is officially appointed by the president of Greece.

According to Article 37 of the Greek Constitution, the president of the Hellenic Republic shall appoint the leader of the political party with the absolute majority of seats in the parliament as prime minister. If no party has the absolute majority, the president shall give the leader of the party with a relative majority (plurality) an exploratory mandate in order to ascertain the possibility of forming a government enjoying the confidence of parliament.

If this possibility cannot be ascertained, the president shall give the exploratory mandate to the leader of the second largest party in Parliament, and if this proves to be unsuccessful, to the leader of the third largest party in parliament. Each exploratory mandate shall be in force for three days.

If all exploratory mandates prove to be unsuccessful, the president summons all party leaders, and if the impossibility to form a cabinet enjoying the confidence of the parliament is confirmed, the president shall attempt to form a cabinet composed of all parties in parliament for the purpose of holding parliamentary elections. If this fails, the president shall entrust the president of the Supreme Administrative Court or of the Supreme Civil and Criminal Court or of the Court of Auditors to form a cabinet as widely accepted as possible to carry out elections after the president dissolves Parliament.

Therefore, the election of members of a certain party to parliament is the equivalent to a vote for that party's leader for prime minister.

== Oath of office ==
=== Religious oath of office ===
Before taking office, the prime minister is sworn in at a religious ceremony inside the Presidential Mansion. Prime ministers are sworn in by the archbishop of Athens who is the head of the Church of Greece. The archbishop begins with a few prayers and the Kyrie Eleison, and then the prime minister-elect places his hand on the Bible placed in between two lit candles, all on a table between him and the archbishop. Following after the archbishop, the prime minister-elect then recites the oath:

I swear in the name of the Holy, Consubstantial and Indivisible Trinity to safeguard the Constitution and the laws and to serve the general interest of the Greek People.

The archbishop then recites a few more blessings, and the participants make the sign of the cross three times. The archbishop then congratulates the new prime minister, who then shakes hands with the president before the pertinent documents are signed.

=== Civil oath of office ===
In 2015 Alexis Tsipras, a self-proclaimed atheist, became the first prime minister to opt for a secular affirmation instead of the traditional religious oath. He was sworn in by President Karolos Papoulias instead of the archbishop of Athens, and, in place of the above oath, recited the affirmation:

Mr President, I would like to assure you, on my honour and conscience, that I will follow the Constitution and the laws and will always serve the general interest of the Greek People.

He then shook hands with the president, who congratulated him, before proceeding to sign the official documents as normal.

When Tsipras assumed the premiership again, on 21 September 2015, President Prokopis Pavlopoulos decided that the affirmation had to be more formal, as it follows:

I affirm, on my honour and conscience, that I will follow the Constitution and the laws and will serve the general interest of the Greek People.

== Official seat of the prime minister ==
The Maximos Mansion (Greek: Μέγαρο Μαξίμου) has been the official seat of the prime minister of Greece since 1982. It is located in central Athens, near Syntagma Square. Although the building contains the offices of the head of the Greek Government, it is not used as the residence of the prime minister. Maximou is a metonym for the Government of Greece.

== History of the office ==
=== During the revolution (1821–1832) ===
During the Greek War of Independence, different regions of Greece that were free of Ottoman control began establishing democratic systems for self-government, such as the Peloponnesian Senate. Meanwhile, a series of overarching National Assemblies, such as the First National Assembly at Epidaurus, met from time to time to provide overall coordination. The First Assembly elected a 5-member executive council, which was headed by Alexandros Mavrokordatos.

The Executive continued to govern Greece until 1828, when Ioannis Kapodistrias assumed the governance of the state as "Governor of Greece"—simultaneously head of state and of the government. Kapodistrias was assassinated in 1831 and his government, presided over by his brother Augustinos, collapsed the following year. It was replaced by a series of collective governmental councils, which lasted until 1833, when Greece became a monarchy.

=== Under Otto's absolute monarchy (1832–1843) ===
In 1832, Greece's nascent experiment with democracy was ended and a monarchy was established with the underage Bavarian Prince Otto as king. Initially, the government was led by a regency council made up of Bavarians. The president of this council, Count Josef Ludwig von Armansperg was the de facto head of government under Otto. Later Otto dismissed his Bavarian advisers and wielded power as an absolute monarch, effectively as head of state and his own head of government.

=== Constitutional monarchy (1843–1862) ===
Naval rank flag of the prime minister of Greece

King Otto's reign as an absolute monarch ended when agitators for a constitution (as promised when the monarchy was established) rose in the 3 September Revolution in 1843. Otto was forced to grant a constitution and Andreas Metaxas took power; he is credited with being the first Greek to formally serve as "Prime Minister."

Once the office of prime minister was established, the responsibility for self-government again fell to the Greek people. However, two factors maintained significant power for the crown: the Greek party structure was weak and client-based, and the monarch was free to select any member of parliament to form a government.

=== Crowned Republic (1863–1910) ===
In 1862, Otto was deposed and the Greek people chose a new monarch in the person of King George I of Greece. In the next 15 years, the party structures began to evolve into more modern ideological parties with the Nationalist Party led by Alexandros Koumoundouros on the right and the more liberal New Party led by Charilaos Trikoupis. Trikoupis was successful after the election of 1874 in forcing the king to accept the "dedilomeni principle" (Greek: αρχή της δεδηλωμένης)--that the leader of the majority in parliament must be selected as prime minister by the king.

The Nationalists were later led by Theodoros Deligiannis who famously said "was against everything Trikoupis was for." This two-party system existed until 1910, even as Georgios Theotokis took over the New Party after the death of Trikoupis in 1895 and the assassination of Deligiannis in 1905, which led to a splintering of parties on the conservative and nationalist side.

=== Upheaval, revolts and war (1910–1949) ===
In 1910, military officers sparked the fall of civilian government when they issued the Goudi Pronunciamento. This event led to the arrival in Greece of the Cretan politician Eleftherios Venizelos. His followers gathered in the Liberal Party, which, despite Venizelos' dominant status, constituted the first true party in the modern sense, in that it was formed around a progressive, liberal and pro-republican political agenda.

The Liberal Party was eventually opposed by the more conservative and pro-royalist People's Party, initially led by Dimitrios Gounaris. The antagonism between the two parties, and the supporters of monarchy and republicanism, would dominate the political landscape until after the Second World War.

=== Stabilization and conflict with the monarchy (1950–1967) ===
The Constitution of 1952 brought stability in the 1950s since the political institutions of Greece had been significantly weakened by the Metaxas' dictatorship (1936–1941), followed by the devastation of Axis occupation of Greece (1941–1945) and by the Greek Civil War (1946–1949). However, the king maintained considerable powers, such as dissolving the government and parliament and calling new elections. Moreover, article 31 stated that the king appoints and fires His ministers (Greek: Ο βασιλεύς διορίζει και παύει τους υπουργούς αυτού). This created confusion as the prime minister was chosen by popular election, but the elected prime minister could not select the government's ministers without the king's approval. Two prime ministers in the 1950s had raised the question as to who governs the state, the king or the prime minister, echoing the disagreements between Eleftherios Venizelos and Constantine I during the National Schism.

Georgios Papandreou and his political party, Center Union, having a moderate reformist platform, gained considerable traction and rose to power in elections of 1963 and later in elections of 1964. However, seeds of resentment towards Papandreou from the military grew as they were excluded from salary increases. He also made a faint attempt to gain control of the military, which alarmed many officers without weakening them. The latter created friction with the King Constantine II, who wanted to be in command of the army and not the elected government. In the meantime, the son of Georgios Papandreou, Andreas Papandreou, who had joined Greek politics after 23 years in the United States as a prominent academic, was campaigning by having fierce anti-monarchy and anti-American rhetoric, destabilizing the fragile political equilibrium. Andreas Papandreou's militant and uncompromising stance made him a target of conspiratorial accusations from ultra-rightists who feared that following any new elections, which the nearly 80-year-old Georgios Papandreou would likely win, his son would be the actual focus of power in the party. These incidents caused a dispute between Georgios Papandreou and King Constantine II, leading to the resignation of the former. The king, potentially acting within his constitutional rights but politically dubious approach, tried to bring members of the Center Union party to his side and form a government, leading to Iouliana of 1965. To end the political deadlock, Georgios Papandreou attempted a more moderate approach with the king, but Andreas Papandreou publicly rejected his father's effort and attacked the whole establishment, attracting the support of 41 members of the Center Union in an effort designed to gain the party's leadership and preventing any compromise. The prolonged political instability between the politicians and the king in finding a solution led a group of Colonels to intervene and rule Greece for seven years.

=== Greek Junta (1967–1974) ===
The first government sworn in following the coup d'etat of April 21st, 1967 was headed by Constantine Kollias, a career judge, a move that echoed the long standing political tradition regarding the appointment of judges as interim Prime Ministers. Following Constantine's countercoup, the King fled the country alongside Kollias, who was replaced by the junta's strongman and until then Minister of the Presidency of the Government, Georgios Papadopoulos. Papadopoulos remained Prime Minister until 1973, having undertaken a year prior the position of Regent alongside his ministerial portfolios (Presidency, Defense, Education -between 1969 and 1970-). His resignation from the premiership only came as a result of his "Liberalisation Plan", which included the promulgation of a republican system of governance following the abolition of the monarcy on June 1st, 1973. He was replaced by veteran politician Spyros Markezinis, in a move that was viewed as a step towards the "politicisation" of the Regime.

This (guided) attempt at reform was interrupted by ambitious brigadier and chief of the ESA, Dimitrios Ioannidis, who had garned the support of lower and mid-ranking officers by claiming that "the Revolution was guided astray". Following his coup (25 November 1973), then incumbent Minister of the Interior Adamantios Androutsopoulos was installed as Prime Minister, while Ioannides continued to lead from the shadows. Androutsopoulos and his cabinet vacated their posts July 24, 1974, under the pressure of the Turkish invasion of Cyprus.

=== Third Hellenic Republic (1975–) ===
With the return of civilian rule under Constantine Karamanlis, the new government, acting under extraordinary circumstances, issued a "Constituting Act" which voided the 1973 constitution. Pending a referendum on a new constitution, the 1952 constitution was temporarily restored, "except for the articles dealing with the form of the State"; the last phrase referred to whether the monarchy would be restored or not. In the meantime, the functions of the king were to be discharged by the incumbent President of the Republic General Phaedon Gizikis who was appointed by the Ioannides' short-lived regime as a nominal figurehead.

The matter was settled by plebiscite on 8 December 1974, by which the monarchy was definitively abolished. A new Constitution, adopted by Parliament and promulgated on 11 June 1975, established a parliamentary democracy with a president as head of state. Karamanlis reinforced the executive branch's power, represented by the prime minister, while the president would act as the head of state with sufficient reserve powers, the right to call elections, appoint a government, dissolve Parliament, and call referendums on important national questions. Moreover, the president could veto any legislation that did not reflect the popular will that could only be overcome with three fifth parliamentary majority. The presidential powers, which overall exceeded those of the monarch under the 1952 Constitution, were drawn inspiration from the recent Gaullism reforms in the France where Karamanlis spent time (1963–1974).

Papandreou triggered a constitutional crisis to revise the constitution in 1985 to increase the powers of the prime minister by removing the reserve powers of the president, which were acting as checks and balances; effectively turning the prime minister into a "parliamentarian autocrat." Papandreou's constitutional proposals took effect in 1986. Greek constitutional reformers commonly include in their proposals the return of some prerogatives taken back to the president to reduce majoritarian politics, i.e., 'winner takes all,' while avoiding conflicts between the president and prime minister in the executive branch.

The Constitution was amended again in 2001, 2008, and 2019 and is in force today.

== See also ==
- List of prime ministers of Greece
- List of cabinets of Greece
- Politics of Greece

== Sources ==
Constitutions of Greece

- "Greek Constitution of 1952". Government Gazette (Greece) ΦΕΚ A 1/1952 (in Greek). National Printing Office.
- "Greek Constitution of 1975". Government Gazette (Greece) ΦΕΚ A 111/1975 (in Greek). National Printing Office.
- "Greek Constitution of 1986". Government Gazette (Greece) ΦΕΚ A 23/1986 (in Greek). National Printing Office.

Books

- Clogg, Richard (2013). A Concise History of Greece. Cambridge: Cambridge University Press. ISBN 9781107656444.
- Close, David H. (2014). Greece since 1945: Politics, Economy and Society. London & New York: Taylor & Francis. ISBN 9781317880011.
- Curtis, Glenn E. (1995). Greece, A Country Study. Maryland: Library of Congress. ISBN 1490436235.
- Dervitsiotis, Alkis (2019). Η έννοια της Κυβέρνησης (in Greek). Athens: P.N. Sakkoulas SA. ISBN 9789604208005.
- Featherstone, Kevin; Katsoudas, Dimitrios K., eds. (1987). Political change in Greece: Before and after the colonels. London & New York: Taylor & Francis. ISBN 9781000992144.
- ——————; Papadimitriou, Dimitris (2015). Prime Ministers in Greece, The Paradox of Power. Oxford: Oxford University Press. ISBN 978-0198717171.
- ——————; Sotiropoulos, Dimitri A. (2020). The Oxford Handbook of Modern Greek Politics. Oxford: Oxford University Press. ISBN 978-0198825104.
- Koliopoulos, John S.; Veremis, Thanos M. [in Greek] (2009). Modern Greece A History Since 1821. Oxford: Wiley-Blackwell. ISBN 9781444314830.
- Lagos, Katerina; Othon, Anastasakis, eds. (2021). The Greek Military Dictatorship Revisiting a Troubled Past, 1967-1974. New York & London: Berghahn Books. ISBN 9781800731752.
- Mouzelis, Nicos P. (1978). Modern Greece: facets of underdevelopment. London: The Macmillan Press Ltd. ISBN 978-0333226155.
- Pridham, Geoffrey, ed. (2012). Securing Democracy. London & New York: Taylor & Francis. ISBN 9781134975419.

Journals

- Clive, Nigel (1985). "The 1985 Greek Election and its Background". Government and Opposition. 20 (4): 488–503. doi:10.1111/j.1477-7053.1985.tb01100.x. JSTOR 44483257.
- Clogg, Richard (1975). "Karamanlis's cautious success: the background". Government and Opposition. 10 (3): 332–255. doi:10.1111/j.1477-7053.1975.tb00644.x. JSTOR 44483305.
- —————— (1996). "Andreas Papandreou – A political profile". Mediterranean Politics. 1 (3): 382–387. doi:10.1080/13629399608414596.
- Tsarouhas, Dimitris (2005). "Explaining an activist military: Greece until 1975" (PDF). Southeast European Politics. 6 (1): 1–13.
