= Konstantinos Kollias =

Greek politician and Axis collaborator

- Κωνσταντίνος Κόλλιας

Prime Minister of Greece
- In office 21 April 1967 – 13 December 1967
- Monarch: Constantine II
- Preceded by: Panagiotis Kanellopoulos
- Succeeded by: Georgios Papadopoulos

Personal details
- Born: 1901 Stylia, Xylokastro-Evrostina, Kingdom of Greece
- Died: 13 July 1998 (aged 96–97) Athens, Greece
- Citizenship: Greece
- Party: Independent
- Education: National and Kapodistrian University of Athens
- Occupation: Jurist; politician

Konstantinos Kollias (Greek: Κωνσταντίνος Κόλλιας; 1901 – 13 July 1998) was a Greek politician and jurist, who became the Attorney General of the Supreme Civil and Criminal Court and who later was proclaimed Prime Minister by the far right-wing military junta, which ruled the country from 1967 until 1974.

== Biography ==
Kollias was born in 1901 in the village of Stylia, Xylokastro-Evrostina, in the province of Korinthia, Kingdom of Greece.

Kollias was Attorney General of Greece during the period 1941-1944 when Greece was occupied by three Axis forces (Germany, Italy and Bulgaria). He was responsible for persecuting resistance members during the occupation, and was indicted after liberation for his actions. According to a published study by Dimitris Kousouris:

...he was not only never suspended while his case was pending, but he was also assigned to organize the work of the Special Collaborators’ Courts (SCC). He was finally acquitted solemnly by his colleagues some months later, with praise “for carrying out his duties under the irregular conditions of foreign occupation.” [...] [S]ymbolizing the continuity of the judicial and state apparatus [of the collaborationist administration] in postwar Greece, Konstantinos Kollias became better known for his later feats as attorney general who tried to stop the inquiry on the murder of a left-wing deputy Grigoris Lambrakis in 1963 and as Prime minister of the colonels’ junta in 1967.

Kollias was proclaimed Prime Minister by the far-right military junta on 21 April 1967, the very day of the coup d'état that overthrew Panagiotis Kanellopoulos' legitimate government. However, nearly eight months later, he was replaced by the head of the military coup d'état Georgios Papadopoulos after the unsuccessful counter-coup of King Constantine II on 13 December 1967.

Kollias died in Athens on 13 July 1998, at the age of 96 or 97.

Political offices
Preceded by Panagiotis Kanellopoulos	Prime Minister of Greece; 1967	Succeeded by Georgios Papadopoulos
