= Medal of Military Merit (Greece) =

- Medal of Military Merit, 1974 version. L-R: 1st, 2nd and 3rd classes
- Type: Three grade military decoration
- Awarded for: Outstanding acts of ongoing service, or outstanding ability in management and organization of a unit or office.
- Presented by: Greece
- Eligibility: Officers of the Hellenic Armed Forces
- Motto: ΓΙΑ ΣΤΡΑΤΙΩΤΙΚΗ ΑΞΙΑ (For Military Merit)
- Status: Currently awarded
- Established: 28 February 1917
- Ribbon circa 1917

Precedence
- Next (higher): Medal for Exceptional Acts
- Next (lower): Long Service and Good Conduct Medal for Warrant Officers & NCOs

The Medal of Military Merit (Greek: Μετάλλιο Στρατιωτικής Αξίας) is a military decoration of Greece. It was originally created in 1916 for wartime meritorious service, but post-World War II became a peace-time medal reserved for officers. After the abolition of the Greek monarchy in 1974, its design was slightly altered.

== History ==
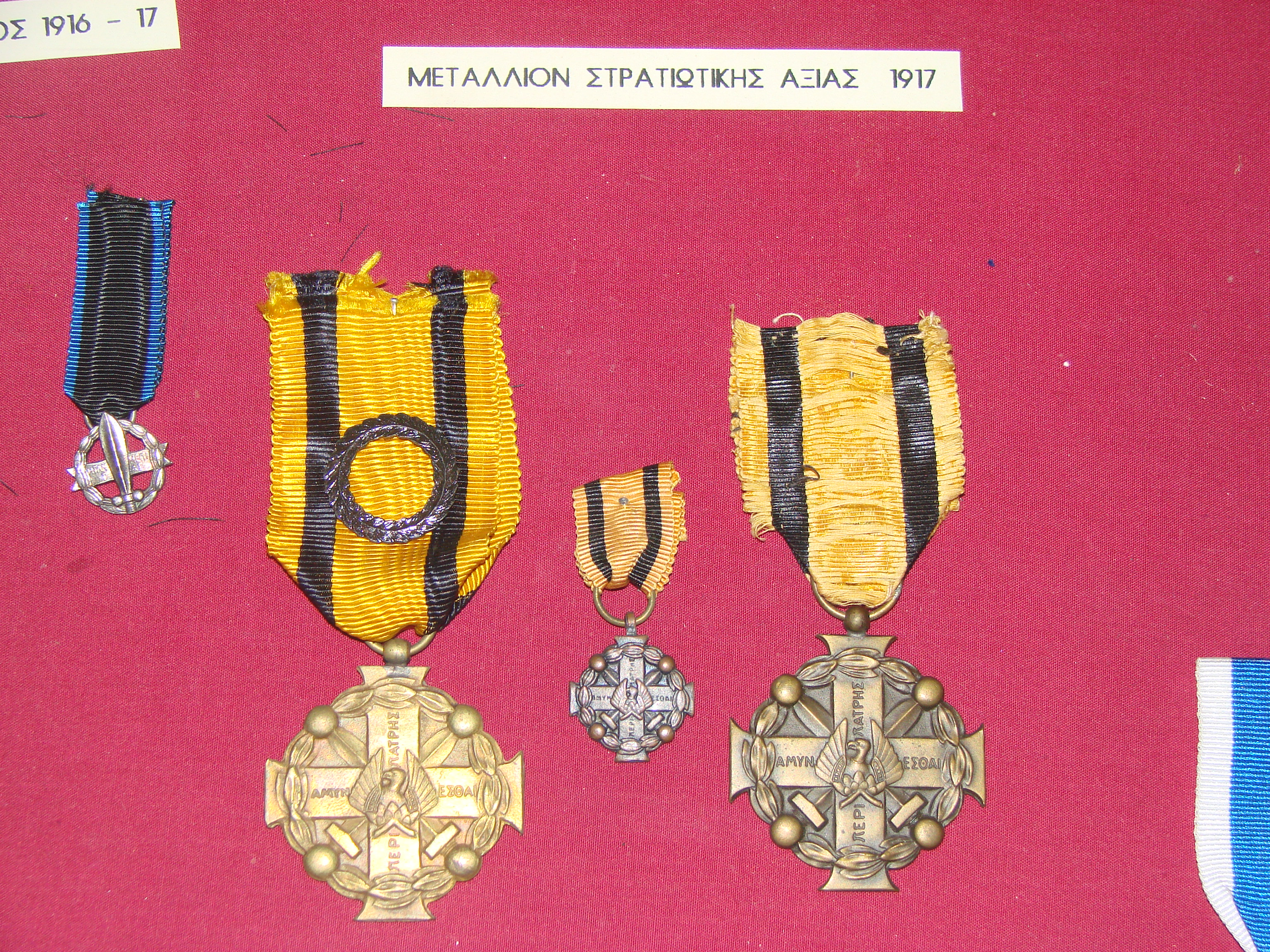
Medal of Military Merit, 1917.

The medal was created as the Military Medal (Στρατιωτικόν Μετάλλιον) by the National Defence Government on 28 October 1916, during the National Schism, and was adopted as the Medal of Military Merit nationwide by Royal Decree on 30 June 1917. Originally the medal had four classes, with the third, second and first classes distinguished respectively by a bronze, silver and gilded laurel wreath on the ribbon, while the fourth class was plain.

== Appearance ==
Its design, by the French sculptor André Rivaud who also designed the 1916 War Cross, was similar to the current version, a copper cross pattée concave with the arms filled, enclosed in a laurel wreath and with two crossed short swords superimposed. The cross's arms bear the legend ΑΜΥΝΕΣΘΑΙ ΠΕΡΙ ΠΑΤΡΗΣ ("Defending the fatherland", a quote of Hector from the Iliad). The 1916 version had a phoenix rising from its ashes in the center, while the post-1974 version substitutes the national emblem of Greece. The 1916 version bore the legend ΕΛΛΑΣ 1916–1917 ("Greece 1916–1917") on the reverse (although some medals omit the date or the inscription altogether), while the current version bears the legend ΓΙΑ ΣΤΡΑΤΙΩΤΙΚΗ ΑΞΙΑ ("For Military Merit"). The 1916 version was suspended by a yellow ribbon with two black stripes, while the current version's ribbon has three equal blue-white-blue stripes, edged with yellow. When worn as a ribbon bar, the circular wreaths were substituted by branches. Due to the scarcity of officially sanctioned devices in the period 1916–1922, awardees often made use of similar devices from other medals, especially the French Croix de Guerre. The 1974 version has only three classes, distinguished by a bronze, silver and gilded laurel branches. The 3rd class is reserved for lower officers, the second class for mid-level officers, and the first class for flag ranks.
