= Iouliana =

Political crisis in Kingdom of Greece

Iouliana (Greek: Ιουλιανά, "July events") describe the political and constitutional crisis in Greece centered on the resignation, on 15 July 1965, of Prime Minister Georgios Papandreou and subsequent appointment, by King Constantine II, of successive prime ministers from Papandreou's own party, the Centre Union, to replace him. Defectors from the Centre Union were branded by Papandreou's sympathizers as "apostates," and describing the events as "Apostasia" (Greek: Αποστασία, "Apostasy") or the "Royal Coup" (Greek: Το Βασιλικό Πραξικόπημα). The Iouliana heralded a prolonged period of political instability, which weakened the fragile post-civil war order, and ultimately led to the establishment of the military regime in April 1967.

== Background ==
=== Rise of Centre Union ===
On September 19, 1961, Prime Minister Konstantinos Karamanlis called a general election (the elections were already expected to happen that autumn). The night of the same day, various factions of Greece's liberal centrist political forces, known as the "Center", joined under the leadership of Georgios Papandreou into a new political party, the Centre Union (EK), whose aim was to provide a credible alternative to the National Radical Union (ERE). The elections of October 29 resulted in victory for ERE. However, this was a result of election fraud and of a wide scale repression of left wing and center sympathizers by the police, military and paramilitary forces loyal to ERE. This terrorism included some assassinations of leftist EDA's supporters by the police and the military. Election fraud was widespread with votes by dead people being counted towards the election results and a case in which 218 police officers were registered in the same address, in a two-store detached house. As a result, Papandreou, other Centre Union politicians and the leftist EDA challenged the result and Papandreou, a gifted orator, launched a "Relentless Struggle" (Greek: Ανένδοτος Αγών) aimed at forcing the "illegal government" of Karamanlis from power. In May 1963, Karamanlis resigned officially over a dispute with King Paul on the latter's planned visit to the United Kingdom, but there has been speculation that the "Relentless Struggle" and other crises (most notably the assassination of the leftist independent MP Gregorios Lambrakis with the alleged involvement of the police and the secret service) had greatly weakened Karamanlis's position.

A general election in late 1963 resulted in Centre Union coming first although without achieving an absolute majority. Papandreou was appointed prime minister and gained a vote of confidence in Parliament since the EDA also voted for him. However, the EDA was considered by Greece's political establishment, including Papandreou himself, as a simple front for the outlawed Communist Party of Greece and not totally without cause. The EDA was by no means communist, but the Communist Party supported it and several sympathizers were prominent EDA members. Papandreou, refusing to govern with communist backing, tendered his resignation.

In a move interpreted as favorable to Papandreou, King Paul immediately dissolved Parliament and called for a new general election. Papandreou, who had implemented a number of popular measures as prime minister before his resignation, won 53% of the popular vote and an absolute parliamentary majority in that election. It is claimed that, as repayment of such a favorable treatment, Papandreou agreed to accept an increased role for the King in the running of the armed forces, which were traditionally conservative and fiercely anticommunist. Whether there was an express agreement or rather a tacit understanding is still disputed, but it is true that Papandreou chose figures who were unlikely to offend the King as his defense ministers and even chose the King's favorite, Lieutenant General Ioannis Gennimatas, for the key post of Chief of the Army General Staff. In his 1963 government, the defense minister was a retired general who had also been the defense minister in the previous (caretaker) government, which supervised the election. In the government formed after the 1964 election, the defense minister was Petros Garoufalias, a loyal friend of Papandreou and one of his financial backers. Garoufalias was conservative and may be said to belong to the right wing of the Centre Union.

Soon after Papandreou had been sworn in again as prime minister, in early 1964, King Paul died and his 24-year-old son succeeded him as Constantine II. Initially, relationships between the King and his Prime Minister seemed cordial, but the horizon soon clouded over. By early 1965, Papandreou and the King had even stopped talking to each other. Their last meeting, before the crisis, was in March 1965.

A number of other factors played an important role in the genesis and the development of the crisis. The Centre Union was a party hastily formed, in late 1961, by the fusion of various centrist factions, which had previously been bitterly bickering with each other. It spanned a broad segment of the political spectrum, managing to house, under the same roof, both Stefanos Stefanopoulos who, but for the sudden emergence of Karamanlis, would have been leader of ERE in 1955 and Prime Minister, and Ilias Tsirimokos, a former minister of the provisional government set up in the mountains of Greece by the Communist resistance in 1944. For this reason, Tsirimokos was commonly regarded, at least by the Right, as a Communist or, at least, a sympathizer. To complicate matters even further, Papandreou, 76 years of age in 1964, was expected soon to have to cede his place to a new leader, and many aspired to this position, most of all the powerful and considerably younger Finance Minister, Konstantinos Mitsotakis. Furthermore, Papandreou's son, Andreas, emerged from political obscurity in 1964 as a new leader of the party's left wing.

=== ASPIDA case ===
ASPIDA was a backronym of "Officers Save Fatherland Ideals Democracy Meritocracy" (Greek: Αξιωματικοί Σώσατε Πατρίδα Ιδανικά Δημοκρατία Αξιοκρατία", which forms the Greek word for "shield"). It was essentially a group of relatively-junior army officers (captains or majors) centered on Captain Aristidis Bouloukos. Generally speaking, they were centrists who also seemed to harbor little sympathy for the communists. The purpose of the secret organization was apparently to oppose actual or perceived right-wing domination of the Greek army through the IDEA secret organization, which was perceived as still being active, and to help its own members obtain favorable postings (hence the reference to "meritocracy" in the acronym since there was a perception that choice postings and promotions went to sympathizers of IDEA regardless of merits). The alleged scandal, which had been revealed in 1965, would have had no serious implications in the political life of Greece if it were not for the alleged membership in the group by Andreas Papandreou, the prime minister's son and a prominent figure of the centre-left. That accusation was never accepted by Andreas, who would later become prime minister himself.

Garoufalias decided to form a committee, which would examine the political implications of the scandal, including Andreas' involvement. Georgios Papandreou disapproved of the decision, but Andreas Papandreou reacted vehemently, which resulted in Petros Garoufalias submitting his resignation.

=== Resignation of Georgios Papandreou ===
After Petros Garoufalias resigned, Georgios Papandreou, spurred by his son's advice, decided to assume total control of the army by succeeding Garoufalias as defense minister. Relations with the King were already bad after a letter he had sent to the prime minister. The letter was considered by some to be insulting in which the King expressed his discontent because Papandreou refused to meet with him. Papandreou replied to the King bitterly but carefully and politely.

The King, following his advisors' advice, refused to accept the prime minister's appointment as defense minister. Some historians and journalists believe the court sought to control the military for a number of generations. The argument was that there was a conflict of interest since the son of the prime minister was accused of involvement in an alleged scandal, which the new defense minister, his father, would have to clear up. In turn, the King proposed the appointment of any other person the prime minister would like. Initially, Papandreou seemed willing to consider the King's proposal, but during their last and bitter meeting, he refused Constantine's proposal and threatened to resign if he was not appointed defense minister.

Constantine refused Papandreou's demand and accepted his subsequent resignation. The political turmoil began from then on and arose from the fact that the King had already decided upon Papandreou's successor, Georgios Athanasiadis-Novas, who was waiting in an adjoining room during the meeting. The fact that Papandreou's successor was sworn in just a few moments after the resignation caused a great amount of criticism and created the impression that the King had wanted to get rid of Papandreou all along.

== Events ==
Papandreou then appealed to public opinion with the slogan "the King reigns but the people rule" and called upon the people to support him. King Constantine made several attempts to form new governments, but none of them lasted for long. He appointed Speaker of Parliament Georgios Athanasiadis-Novas as prime minister, who was followed by many dissidents from the Centre Union, the infamous apostates, most prominent among whom was future Prime Minister Konstantinos Mitsotakis, and conservative ERE MPs but not enough to gain a vote of confidence in parliament. He was replaced on 20 August of the same year by Ilias Tsirimokos with similar results. Failing to gain a vote of confidence, Tsirimokos was dismissed on September 17.

Constantine II next induced some of Papandreou's dissidents, led by Stephanos Stephanopoulos, to form a government of "King's men", which lasted until December 22, 1966, amid mounting strikes and protests. When Stephanopoulos resigned in frustration, Constantine appointed an interim government under Ioannis Paraskevopoulos, which called elections for 28 May 1967. The government did not last even until the scheduled elections. It was replaced on 3 April 1967 by another interim government under Panagiotis Kanellopoulos, who was the active leader of ERE (National Radical Union) and was still supposed to organize a fair election.

There were many indications that Papandreou's Centre Union would not be able to form a working government by itself in the scheduled elections. There therefore existed a strong possibility that the Centre Union would be forced into an alliance with the socialist EDA (United Democratic Left). The sense of a "Communist threat", along with putschist tendencies in some nationalist fractions of the Hellenic Armed Forces, led to a coup d'état on 21 April 1967 which established a military dictatorship, better known as the "Regime of the Colonels".

== See also ==
- Sotiris Petroulas
- Politics of Greece

== Additional reading ==
- Woodhouse, C.M. (1998). Modern Greece a Short History. London: Faber & Faber. ISBN 0-571-19794-9.
- Γιάννης Κάτρης (1974). Η γέννηση του νεοφασισμού στην Ελλάδα 1960-1970 (in Greek). Athens: Παπαζήση.
- Αλέξης Παπαχελάς (1997). Ο βιασμός της ελληνικής δημοκρατίας (in Greek). Athens:Εστία. ISBN 960-05-0748-1.
- Koliopoulos, John S.; Veremis, Thanos M. [in Greek] (2009). Modern Greece A History Since 1821. Oxford: Wiley-Blackwell. ISBN 978-1-4443-1483-0.
- Close, David H. (2014). Greece since 1945: Politics, Economy and Society. London & New York: Taylor & Francis. ISBN 978-1-317-88001-1.
- Clogg, Richard (2013). A Concise History of Greece. Cambridge: Cambridge University Press. ISBN 978-1-107-65644-4.
