= Hellenic Military Academy =

Greek military academy

Coordinates: 37°50′32″N 23°48′44″E

Hellenic Army Academy
- Στρατιωτική Σχολή Ευελπίδων
- Coat of Arms of the Hellenic Army Academy
- Other name: Evelpidon or ΣΣΕ
- Motto: Ἄρχεσθαι μαθὼν ἄρχειν ἐπιστήσει
- Motto in English: When you learn how to be ruled, you will learn how to rule
- Type: Service academy
- Established: 1828; 198 years ago
- Affiliations: Hellenic Army
- Superintendent: Major General Vasileios Lampropoulos
- Location: Vari, Attica, Greece
- Website: sse.army.gr/en

The Hellenic Army Academy (Greek: Στρατιωτική Σχολή Ευελπίδων, ΣΣΕ), commonly known as the Evelpidon, is a military academy. It is the Officer cadet school of the Greek Army and the oldest third-level educational institution in Greece. It was founded in 1828 in Nafplio by Ioannis Kapodistrias, the first governor of the modern Greek state. It is often listed as one of the top 10 military academies worldwide by various websites and magazines.

== Overview ==
The institution was created to provide officers for all the Arms of the Hellenic Army (Infantry, Armour, Artillery, Signals, Engineering, and Army Aviation), as well as some of the Corps (the Technical Corps, the Transport and Supply Corps, and the Ordnance Corps). By contrast, officers in the Legal Corps, the Medical Corps, the Finance Corps, and the Auditing Corps are graduates of the Corps Officers Military Academy (Στρατιωτική Σχολή Αξιωματικών Σωμάτων), with the exception of nurse officers in the Medical Corps, who are graduates of the Nurse Officer Academy (Σχολή Αξιωματικών Νοσηλευτών). The School also trains cadets on behalf of foreign allied countries.

The origin of the designation "Evelpides" (Greek: Εὐέλπιδες, romanized: Euélpides, lit. 'bearers of high hopes') is from a passage by the historian Thucydides, where the Corinthians describe their adversaries, the Athenians, as "adventurous beyond their power, daring beyond their judgment, and bearers of high hopes when in danger" (History of the Peloponnesian War, Book I, 70).

== History ==
The old building of the academy in Kypseli, Athens

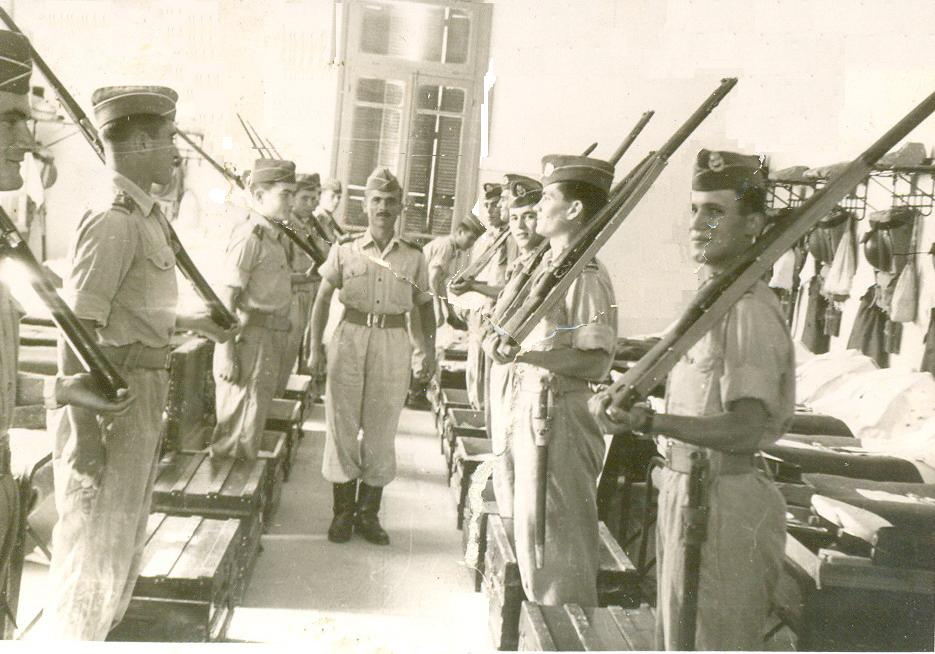
Cadets in summer uniform and Lee–Enfield rifles, 1955

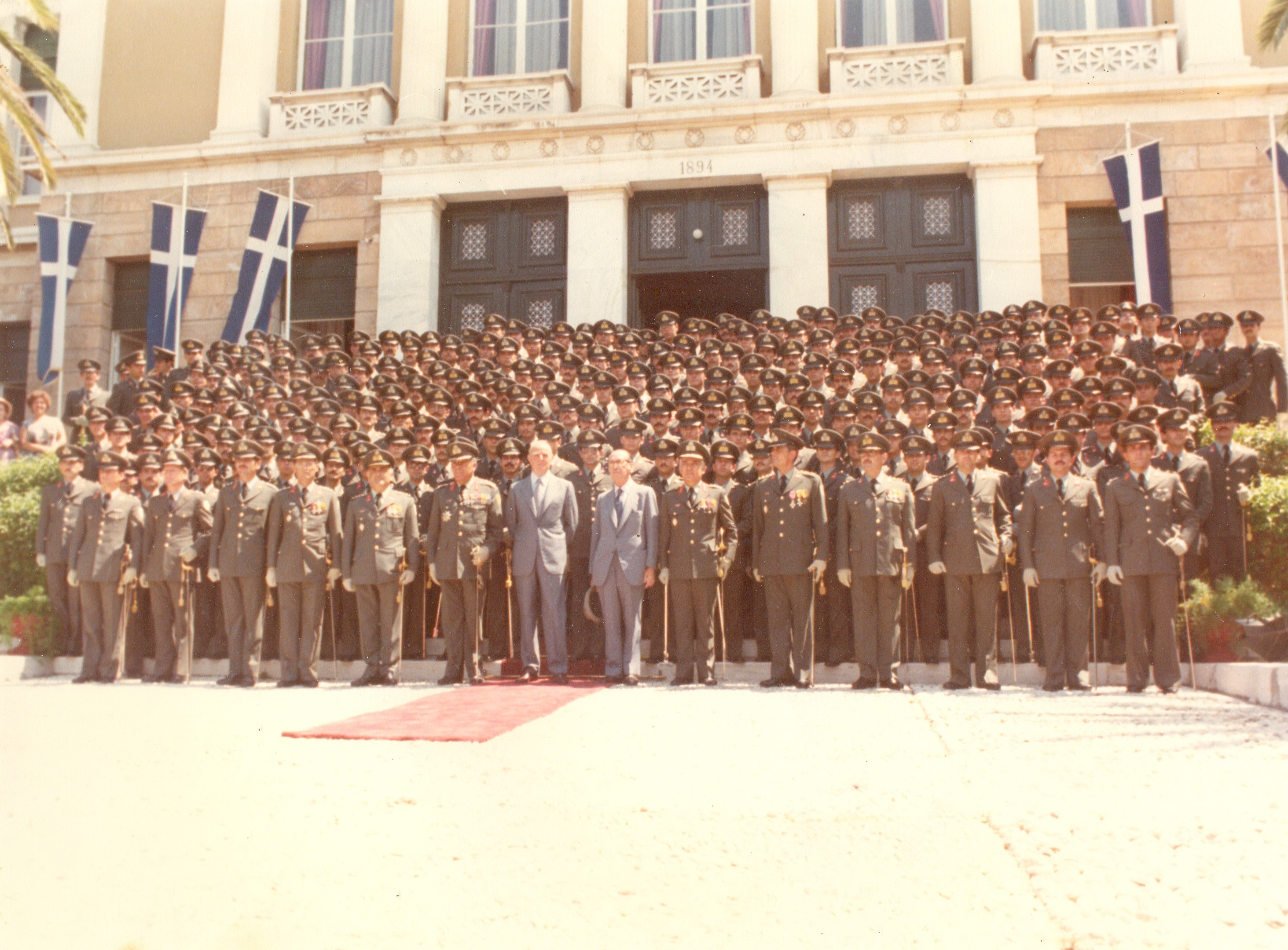
Class of 1981, in the middle the then President of the Republic Konstantinos Karamanlis.

The Hellenic Army Academy (HAA) was founded by the first Governor of Greece, Ioannis Kapodistrias. He announced the foundation of the academy in June 1828 and named the first five students “Evelpides” (“those who hold good hopes”). The academy's history is linked with that of the modern Greek state, producing military personnel who have participated in the country's armed conflicts. In 1926 the State awarded the academy the War Flag, followed by the Medal of Military Merit Class A in 1931, the War Cross Class A in 1943, the Brigadier of the Award of Valor in 1946, and the Higher Brigadier of the Savior in 1978.

== Education and training ==
The academy's principal mission is providing the Army with military scientists and leaders by means of military life and multi-faceted military and academic education.

For admission to the academy, a high score in the Panhellenic entrance exams is required. The duration of study is four years. Each academic year is divided into two semesters. The duration of the winter semester is September to February, while the duration of the spring semester is March to August. Each semester comprises Academic and Military education, both theoretical and applied. Each academic year consists of thirty-nine weeks, of which twenty-six are academic and thirteen are purely military. Of these, four weeks are used for the final exams of the 1st and 2nd semester, while the cadets (Evelpides) are on leave for eight weeks. The HAA offers a broad academic education, which is complemented and also expanded by military education. The curriculum for academic education comprises subjects from a wide range of disciplines, from Humanities and Social Sciences to Applied Science, from Chemistry to History, and from Psychology to Engineering.

Military education begins in the 1st year of study, when the cadet (Evelpis) goes through Basic Military Training and is trained in individual tactics. In the years that follow, s/he masters the command of teams and platoons and learns about the organization and operation of the Infantry Company. Military education takes place either in Vari or in other areas of Greece (Litochoro of Pieria, Parnassos, etc.). Physical education is an important part of the cadet's education, and aims, on the one hand, at the cadets’ personal strengthening so as to render them capable of overcoming hardships and coping with the demanding way of life of military personnel, and, on the other hand, at their role as trainers, who will set up and execute an appropriate, safe and effective physical education programme for their subordinates. Besides the intense programme aimed at improving Cadets’ physical fitness, each year internal championships are held between the two Βatallions in a variety of sports, as well as a Championship among the Academies of the three Branches, in which the HAA has excelled each year.

The corps of Cadets (Evelpides) is organized in a regiment comprising two Battalions. Τhe Battalions are named after heroes, as 1st Cadet Battalion «Infantry Maj. Velissarios Ioannis» and 2nd Cadet Battalion «Artillery Maj. Paparrodou Ioannis». Today, the academy hosts cadets from 20 different countries.

On completing their studies at the HAA, many graduates go on to pursue either postgraduate programmes or other undergraduate programmes in various Greek or foreign Higher Education institutions. In order to shape the Cadets into leaders, all of the academy's personnel, both academic and military, set themselves as an example and guide the young Evelpides since their admission at the HAA, so that they foster the ideals and principles that characterize the Hellenic Army Officer. Ethical integrity is a prerequisite, and life in the HAA abides by the standards of the Evelpides’ code of ethics. In an effort to continuously improve the education of Hellenic Army officers, a programme to upgrade the provided education is currently in progress at the HAA.
