= Battle of Meligalas =

1944 battle of WWII in Meligalas, Greece

- Part of The Greek Resistance
| Date | 13–15 September 1944 |
| Location | Meligalas, Messenia, Greece 37°13′23″N 21°57′14″E |
| Result | ELAS victory |

Belligerents
| ELAS | Security Battalions |

Commanders and leaders
| Giannis Michalopoulos; Tasos Anastasopoulos; Kostas Basakidis | Dimitris Perrotis (executed); Dionysios Papadopoulos (WIA) (POW); Nikos Theofanous; Panagiotis Benos † |

Units involved
| 9th and 8th ELAS Regiments, elements of 11th Regiment, 9th Brigade staff, Reserve ELAS, Mavroskoufides | Meligalas garrison |

Strength
| About 1,200 | About 1,000 |

Casualties and losses
| Over 150 dead, 250 wounded | See below |
- Location within Greece

The Battle of Meligalas (Greek: Μάχη του Μελιγαλά, romanized: Machi tou Meligala) took place during the Axis occupation of Greece in Meligalas in southwestern Greece on 13–15 September 1944. Greek Resistance forces of the Greek People's Liberation Army (ELAS) defeated a Security Battalion garrison loyal to the collaborationist government.

Partisan ELAS forces, the military wing of the Communist-led National Liberation Front (EAM), had begun operating in the Peloponnese from 1942 and in 1943 began to establish their control over the area. In response, the German occupation authorities formed the Security Battalions, which took part not only in anti-guerrilla operations but also in mass reprisals against local civilian populations. The Security Battalions were increasingly targeted by ELAS in 1944. Following the withdrawal of German forces from the Peloponnese in September, a force of about 1,000 Battalionists gathered in Meligalas, where they were quickly surrounded by around 1,200 ELAS partisans. After three days of fighting, the ELAS forces broke the town's defences; victorious, they executed between 700 and 1,100 prisoners and civilians. After news of the massacre spread, the leadership of EAM took steps to ensure a peaceful transition of power in most of the country, limiting reprisal occurrences.

During the post-war period and following the Greek Civil War, the ruling right-wing establishment immortalized the Meligalas massacre as evidence of communist brutality and memorialized the victims as patriotic heroes. Following the end of right-wing rule in 1981, official support of the commemoration ceased. The massacre continues to be commemorated by the descendants of the Battalionists and their ideological sympathizers in the far-right and remains an antifascist point of reference for the far-left in Greece.

== Political and military background ==
=== Emergence of the Resistance in occupied Messenia ===
Following the German invasion of Greece in April 1941, German forces were quickly transferred out of Greece for the forthcoming invasion of the Soviet Union. Most of Greece, including the Peloponnese, came under Italian military control as a result.

In the Kalamata Province, the communist-led National Liberation Front (EAM) emerged in 1942, forming initial partisan resistance against the unpopular confiscation of crops by the Italian military authorities. The engagements of these first left-wing groups were limited to skirmishes with the Greek Gendarmerie and the Italian Army, and by late 1942 they were almost all either destroyed or forced to evacuate to Central Greece. In April 1943, when the Peloponnese was considered "partisan-free" by the occupation authorities, Dimitris Michas, who had previously been imprisoned by the Italians, formed a new partisan group on orders from EAM. Following his first successes, and with the arrival of reinforcements from the mainland, the group began openly attacking Italian soldiers and their Greek informants. By June 1943, the number of Greek People's Liberation Army (ELAS) partisans in the Peloponnese had reached about 500 men in total. Due to the lack of a central command and communication difficulties, they were dispersed and operated as quasi-autonomous groups. In August 1943, according to a German intelligence report, partisan activity spiked in the mountainous areas of Messenia in southwestern Peloponnese, where 800 men under Kostas Kanellopoulos operated.

In early 1943, the "Hellenic Army" (ES), formed by mostly royalist former officers, was established as a resistance group and formed its own small armed groups, which clashed with the Italians. Initially it declared itself a politically independent and neutral force, but after forging ties with royalist networks chiefly in the Peloponnese and in Athens, it shifted to an anti-EAM stance by July. The British made efforts to unify the local resistance groups in the Peloponnese, but these efforts failed, and in August 1943 ES clashed with ELAS, while some of its most prominent leaders, such as Dionysios Papadongonas and possibly also Tilemachos Vrettakos, respectively sought collaboration with the Italian and German occupation authorities against ELAS. However, the apparent delay of German assistance, the losses suffered by Vrettakos' men in a clash with a German force at Pyrgaki, Arcadia, and the end of Allied air drops to both ES and ELAS, resulted in ES's defeat in October, leaving EAM/ELAS as the sole organized Resistance force in the Peloponnese.

=== German takeover and the establishment of the Security Battalions ===
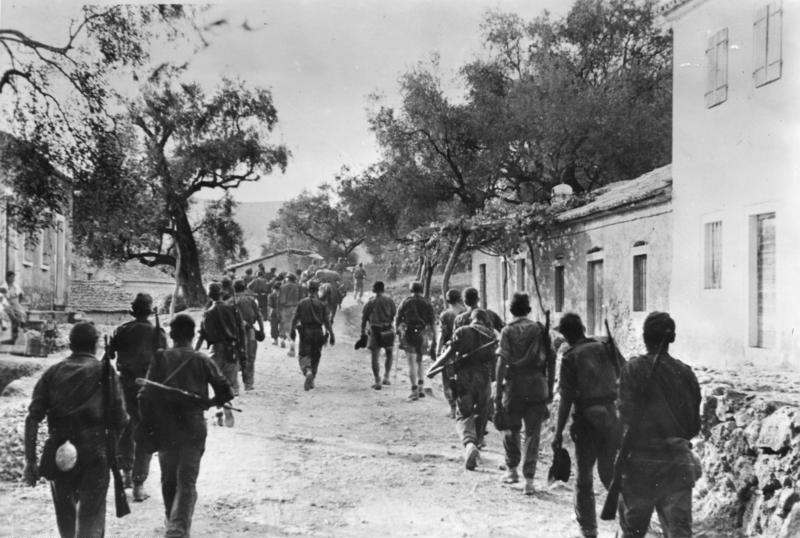
German troops enter the formerly Italian zone, Corfu 1943

In the meantime, after the Italian capitulation in September 1943, the overall command of anti-partisan operations in the southern Peloponnese fell to the German Major General Karl von Le Suire, commander of the 117th Jäger Division, which had been moved to the area in July. In October, Le Suire was named the sole military commander in the Peloponnese. The town of Meligalas in northern Messenia, which under Italian occupation had housed a Carabinieri station, now became the seat of two German infantry companies. The Italian capitulation led to the immediate and considerable reinforcement of ELAS in morale, personnel, and materiel, and with British support ELAS forces began attacking German targets. In the mountainous districts of the Peloponnese, representatives of EAM/ELAS translated their monopoly of armed resistance into the exercise of authority, but faced difficulties with the mostly conservative and royalist local population. Peasant disaffection was further fuelled by the requirement to feed the partisans amidst conditions of malnourishment and a general disruption of the agricultural production caused by the mounting hyperinflation and by the large-scale German anti-partisan sweeps (Säuberungen). These operations involved reprisals against the civilian population, following a July order of the commander of the LXVIII Corps, Hellmuth Felmy. In the Peloponnese, Le Suire carried these orders out with particular ruthlessness, particularly as the partisan threat mounted, resulting in the Kalavryta massacre in December.

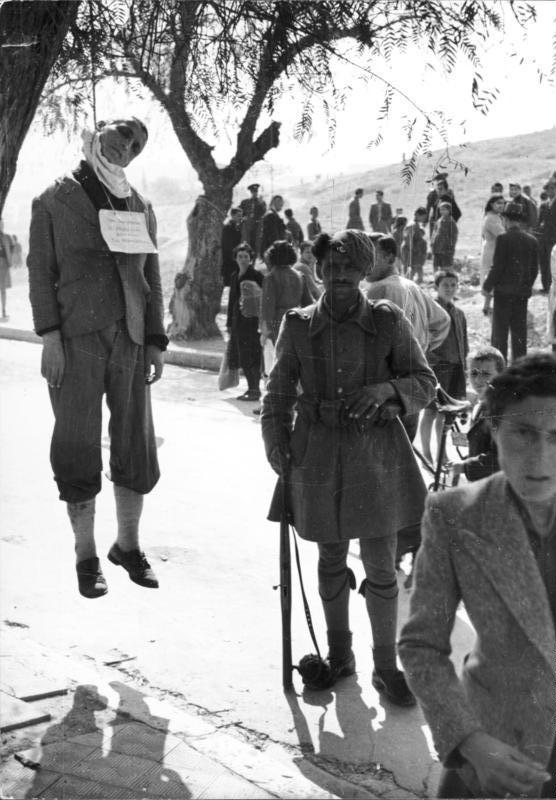
A soldier of the Evzone Security Battalions photographed next to an executed EPON member (Athens, 1944)

In 1943, the German commanders in Greece concluded that their own forces were insufficient to suppress ELAS. As a result, and in order to "spare German blood", they decided to use the anti-communist elements of Greek society to fight EAM. In addition to the "Evzone Battalions" (Ευζωνικά Τάγματα) established by the collaborationist government of Ioannis Rallis, in late 1943 independent "Security Battalions" (Τάγματα Ασφαλείας, ΤΑ) began being raised, particularly in the Peloponnese, where the political affiliations of a large part of the population and the violent dissolution of ES provided a broad recruitment pool of anti-communists—five battalions in total, which were placed under the overall command of Papadongonas. After a request from the collaborator prefect of Messenia, Dimitrios Perrotis, the Rallis government ordered in February 1944 a municipality-supported Security Battalion to be formed in Kalamata. This Battalion merged in March with the Security Battalion under the command of Major Panagiotis Stoupas that arrived from Athens in Meligalas, a location that controlled the road from Kalamata to Tripolis and the entire area of the south. After all officers of the Military District of Messenia were drafted following Papadongonas's intervention, the Security Battalion of Messenia, having major Panagiotis Georganas as commandant, included five companies, one stationed at Kopanaki, another at Kalamata, which transformed into a battalion with major Antonios Smyrlis as its commander, and three stationed at Meligalas. The Security Battalions were subordinated to the Higher SS and Police Leader in Greece, Walter Schimana, but the development of relations of trust between the individual battalion commands and the local German authorities led to them enjoying a relative freedom of movement. The Security Battalions served as garrisons in towns across the Peloponnese, but also increasingly participated in German anti-partisan operations; they chose those that would be executed among prisoners and themselves executed hostages as reprisals for partisan attacks on German targets (as happened after the execution of Major General Franz Krech by ELAS in April 1944), gaining a reputation for lack of discipline and brutality. Officers and supporters of the Security Battalion of Meligalas-Kalamata publicly vindicated its actions in anticommunist declarations against EAM, similar in content with the era's Nazi discourse, with antisemitic and anti-Slavic references and defending conservative values.

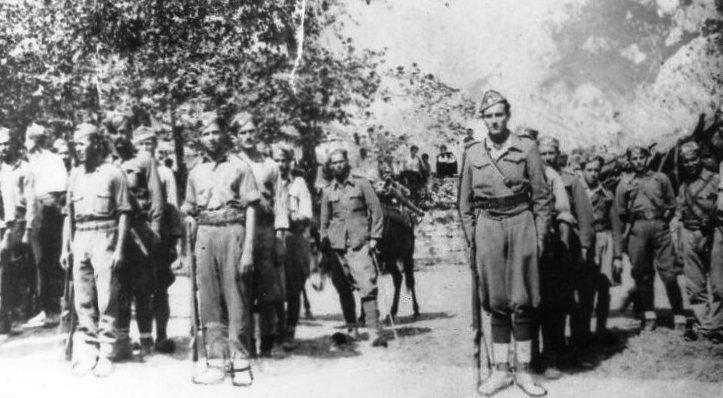
ELAS fighters

After suffering some early blows, ELAS managed to recover its influence, and from 1944 conducted constant sabotage on the supply routes used by the German army. In April 1944, Meligalas became the first town held by a German garrison to be attacked by ELAS, but the assault was beaten back. In the same month, EAM leader Georgios Siantos, following reports of indiscipline among the partisan forces in the Peloponnese, sent Aris Velouchiotis there as representative of the Political Committee of National Liberation (PEEA), EAM's newly established parallel government. Velouchiotis' task was to reorganize the 3rd ELAS Division, with a total strength of some 6,000 men. They were facing 18,000 German soldiers and 5,000 Battalionists. Velouchiotis quickly imposed strict discipline, managing to reverse the decline in partisan numbers and increase the number of their attacks on enemy targets. The deterioration of the military situation led Felmy to declare the Peloponnese as a combat zone in May, which allowed Le Suire to in turn declare martial law, limiting the civilian population's freedom of movement and assembly. Nevertheless, the sweeps and reprisals by the Germans and their collaborators were not enough to reverse ELAS penetration of the countryside in Messenia and neighbouring Laconia. In the area of Kalamata, where during the occupation thousands of homes were torched and about 1,500 people had been executed, the reprisals of the Security Battalions continued until late summer. Following the assassination of Georganas by the OPLA of Kalamata, a para-military organization of the EAM movement with police duties aiming to punish collaborators, in June, Smyrlis executed 27 communists in retribution. In late August, while clashes between the ELAS and the Germans had decreased, those between ELAS and the Security Battalions increased steadily.

=== Position of the Greek collaborators ===
... never before was there such a fine line between the demand for vengeance and the call for justice, between anarchy and law ...

— Jan Kott, Polish politician and theatre critic, on the end of World War II

In November 1943, the Moscow Conference issued a joint "Statement on Atrocities" by the Big Three (Franklin Roosevelt, Winston Churchill and Joseph Stalin) concerning the prosecution and trial of those Germans responsible for war crimes against occupied nations. This also served as the basis for the condemnation of Axis collaborators in the occupied countries. In the spirit of this declaration, the Greek government in exile announced the revocation of Greek nationality from the members of the collaborationist governments, while PEEA issued a legal act proscribing the death penalty for high treason for those who collaborated with the occupation authorities, including the members of the Security Battalions. However, the burgeoning confrontation between EAM and the government in exile and its British backers, who at least since 1943 began to view EAM as an obstacle to their own plans for Britain's post-war role in Greece, led the British to consider the possibility of using the Security Battalions as part of the planned post-war national Greek army, or at least as a means of applying pressure and getting EAM to agree to support a national unity government. Thus, during negotiations on forming a new government, Georgios Papandreou, head of the government in exile, resisted the pressure of the PEEA delegates to publicly condemn the Security Battalions, arguing that this had already been done in the Lebanon Conference in May 1944, and in June he caused the Allied propaganda against the Security Battalions, both through the dropping of leaflets and through radio emissions, to be suspended.

With the Red Army advancing in the Eastern Front and the Battle of Romania, on 23 August 1944 the German command decided to withdraw the 117th Division from the Peloponnese. Three days later the complete evacuation of German forces from mainland Greece was decided. The British desired the maintenance of the status quo until the arrival of their forces and the Papandreou government, and above all wanted to avoid German arms and equipment from falling into the hands of the partisans. On the other hand, EAM/ELAS and its supporters were eager for revenge on the remnants of the collaborationist Gendarmerie and the Security Battalions. In his capacity as commander of the General Staff of ELAS, Velouchiotis had sent to the 3rd ELAS Division a plan of action to assume control of cities by people's power after the German withdrawal and the "dissolution of the Security Battalions by any means and with full force." After the German troops withdrew from the Peloponnese, the position of their former allies became highly precarious, and fears of ELAS reprisals spread. On 3 September, the military head of ELAS, Stefanos Sarafis, issued a proclamation calling upon the members of the Security Battalions to surrender with their weapons, in order to safeguard their lives. On the same day, the British Lieutenant-general Ronald Scobie, appointed joint commander-in-chief of all Greek forces, issued an order to his deputy in Athens, the Greek Lieutenant general Panagiotis Spiliotopoulos, to recommend to the Security Battalions personnel to either desert or to surrender themselves to him, with the promise that they would be treated as regular prisoners of war. This order, however, either did not apply to the Security Battalions in the Peloponnese or was in the event ignored by them. As EAM had joined the Papandreou government on 15 August, on 6 September a formal declaration of the new national unity government was issued, in which the members of the Security Battalions were designated as criminals against the fatherland, and called upon to "immediately abandon" their positions and join the Allies. At the same time, the declaration called on the Resistance forces to stop any acts of reprisal, insisting that dispensing justice was a right reserved by the state and not of "organizations and individuals", while promising that "the national nemesis will be implacable".

=== German withdrawal and aftermath ===
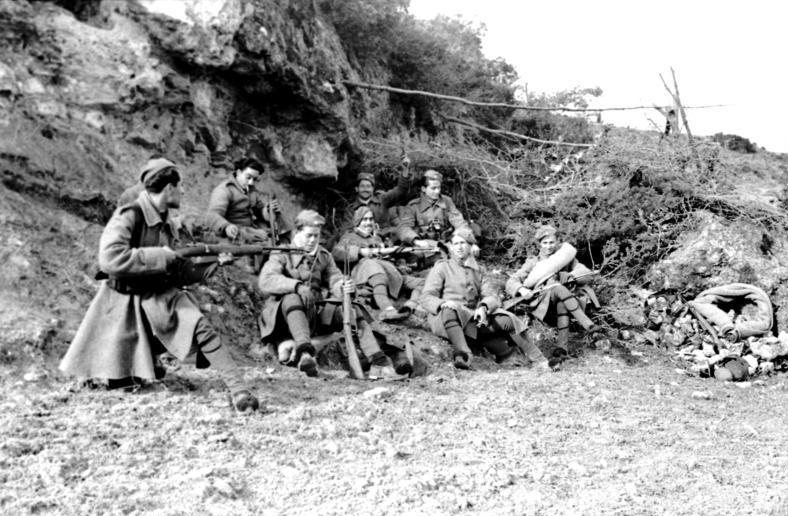
Men of the Security Battalions rest in the countryside (1943)

During the last months of the German occupation, Walter Blume, the head of the German security police (SD) in Greece developed the so-called "chaos thesis", involving not only a thorough scorched earth policy, but also encouraging the slide of Greece into civil war and chaos. While Blume's more radical proposals concerning the elimination of the (mostly anti-communist and pro-British) pre-war political leadership were halted by more moderate elements in the German leadership, as they withdrew from the Peloponnese in early September, the Germans destroyed bridges and railway lines and left weapons and ammunition to the Security Battalions, laying the groundwork for a civil war with ELAS.

Based on the denunciation of the Security Battalions by the national unity government, ELAS considered the Security Battalions as enemy formations. At Pyrgos, the capital of Elis Prefecture, the commander of the local battalion, Georgios Kokkonis, announced that he placed his unit under the command of the exiled king George II and the national government. Kokkonis conducted negotiations with ELAS, trying to prevent its entry into the city before the arrival of an official government representative, while ELAS demanded the immediate disarmament of the unit. In the end, ELAS attacked on 9 September and after a bloody struggle seized the city on the next day.

== Events in Messenia ==
At Kalamata, the Germans departed on 5 September, leaving the Gendarmerie as the sole official armed force in the city. Using representatives of the Allied Middle East Headquarters as intermediaries, ELAS approached the prefect of Messenia, Dimitrios Perrotis, proposing the disarmament of the local Security Battalions and their confinement as prisoners until the arrival of the exiled national government. After the proposal was rejected, ELAS attacked the city at dawn of 9 September. As the partisans overcame the Battalionists' resistance, large numbers of local civilians began arriving in the city to take revenge on them. About 100–120 Battalionists, under the command of 2nd Lieutenant Nikos Theofanous and Perrotis, managed to escape the city via the unguarded railway line and sought refuge at Meligalas, where a strong force of about 800 Security Battalion men was already ensconced. On the road to Meligalas, Perrotis spread the rumour that the partisans were committed massacres and drafted collaborators along with unwilling peasants. The Battalionist force gathered at Meligalas was further reinforced by another 100–120 men who arrived from Kopanaki on 11 September.

Consequently, the capture of Meligalas assumed a major importance for ELAS in its bid to secure its control over the Peloponnese. The archimandrite Ioil Giannakopoulos along with two British officers, went to the town to deliver a proposal for the disarmament of the Battalionists and their transfer to a secure prisoner camp until the arrival of the government, in order to secure life and property for themselves and their families, but Perrotis rejected it. Pleas by relatives of the Battalionists who arrived from nearby villages had a similar fate.

=== Battle of Meligalas ===
The Battalionists installed a heavy machine gun in the clock tower of the main church in Meligalas, Agios Ilias, and distributed the roughly 50 light machine guns they possessed in houses around the church and in semi-circular ramparts around the paddock of Meligalas. They also fortified the houses and cleared the surrounding area, hindering ELAS's advance. ELAS forces, numbering about 1,200 men from the 8th and 9th Regiments, launched their attack at dawn of 13 September. The attack followed a plan laid down with the participation of Giannis Michalopoulos (nom de guerre "Orion") from the staff of the 9th ELAS Brigade: 2/9 Battalion assumed the sector between the Meligalas–Anthousa and Meligalas–Neochori roads, 1/9 Battalion assumed the sector northeast of Profitis Ilias height, 3/9 Battalion the northern sector up to the road towards Meropi, and 1/8 Battalion the eastern plain until the road to Skala. At the Skala heights, ELAS also positioned its sole 10.5 cm gun (lacking a gun carriage), commanded by the artillery captain Kostas Kalogeropoulos. The ELAS plan aimed at the rapid advance of 2/9 Battalion, under Captain Tasos Anastasopoulos ("Kolopilalas") from the edge of the settlement to the main square, so that the Agios Ilias fort could be attacked on two sides.

The attackers encountered a minefield of improvised mines (boxes with dynamite) planted by the Battalionists the previous afternoon and evening, during the negotiations with ELAS. A new plan was made, aiming at the storming of Agios Ilias by a company of 2/9 Battalion under Kostas Basakidis. This new assault forced the Battalionists to dismount the heavy machine gun from the clock tower, while the attack of 1/8 Battalion forced the garrison of the railway station to retreat to the bedesten, where a number of EAM sympathizers were being held hostage, while major Smyrlis was located by ELAS partisans and was executed. From the afternoon to nightfall, the lines of the combatants remained the same, but the losses suffered by the Battalionists led to a fall in their morale and unwillingness to continue the battle. Their commander, Major Dionysios Papadopulos, sent a delegation to request aid from Panagiotis Stoupas in nearby Gargalianoi, but the delegates abandoned their mission as soon as they left Meligalas.

The next day, a British group got ELAS's permission to approach the besieged Battalionsts to facilitate their surrender, but their proposal was rejected anew. At noon of 14 September, a group of 30 partisans attacked by throwing German Teller mines on the barbed wire protecting Agios Ilias, but was repulsed amidst a hail of fire by the Battalionists. A squad under Basakidis managed to breach the barricades of the defenders, but left without support, they were thrown back in a counterattack led by the sergeant major Panagiotis Benos. Fighting without cover in a plain, the partisans had many casualties. The sight of wounded ELAS fighters, and news of a murder committed by Battalionists, heightened the hostile mood among the civilians observing the battle.

On the morning of 15 September, the leaders of the Security Battalions met in council. Major Papadopoulos proposed attempting a breakthrough in the direction of Gargalianoi, but the council was abruptly interrupted when the house was hit by a mortar bomb. In addition, rumours of the breakthrough plan were spread by Perrotis' men, panicking the wounded Battalionists, but also the imprisoned EAM sympathizers. The council was terminated following a new ELAS attack on Agios Ilias, during which Basakidis' men, using hand grenades and submachine guns, managed to push the Battalionists back. From their new positions, four ELAS partisans began firing with their light machine guns into the interior of the town, while on the sector of 1/8 Battalion, Battalionists began raising white flags in surrender. A few dozen Battalionists under Major Kazakos tried to escape to the south to Derveni, but suffered heavy casualties from the Reserve ELAS, the Mavroskoufides (Velouchiotis' personal guard), and a squad of 11th ELAS Regiment at the heights near Anthousa. Velouchiotis's personal guard and part of the 11th Regiment from Arcadia accompanied Velouchiotis himself, who had issued battle orders, was kept up-to-date for developments via radio and, having been informed that ELAS was winning, rushed to inspect the situation.

=== Reprisals and executions ===
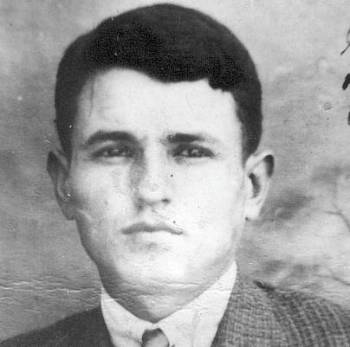
The lawyer Vasilis Bravos, head of the ELAS court martial that ordered the executions at the well

Once the battle ended, civilians burst into Meligalas and an unchecked plunder and massacre, by a multitude of relatives of the Battalionists' victims who sought revenge, ensued. According to a contemporary report preserved in the archives of the Communist Party of Greece (KKE), these were inhabitants of the village of Skala, which had been torched by the German army. Among the captive Battalionists held in the bedesten, Velouchiotis—who arrived at Meligalas shortly after the end of the battle with his personal escort—recognized a gendarme whom he had previously arrested and then released, and ordered his execution. The first reprisal wave, tacitly encouraged by ELAS through the deliberately loose guarding of its captives, was followed by a series of organized executions.

A partisan court martial was set up in the town, headed by the lawyers Vasilis Bravos and Ioannis Karamouzis. This court summarily condemned not only the roughly 60 officers and other leaders of the Battalions—lists with their names had been provided by local EAM cells—but also many others, including for reasons having more to do with personal differences rather than any crime committed. The executions took place at an abandoned well ("πηγάδα") outside the town. According to usual practice, to avoid the executioners being recognized, the executions were carried out by an ELAS detachment from a different area, most likely a squad of 8th Regiment, whose men were from the area of Kosmas and Tsitalia in Arcadia.

Depending on their ideological and political sympathies, sources vary in the way they present the stance of Velouchiotis and his comrades in the events, ranging from hagiographical emphasis on acts of clemency towards civilians, to their portrayal as bloodthirsty criminals. On 17 September, Velouchiotis moved to Kalamata, where Perrotis and other collaborationist officials were also brought. At the central square of the city, the enraged crowd broke the ranks of the ELAS militia and lynched some of the prisoners, while twelve of them were hanged from lampposts.

=== Casualty estimates ===
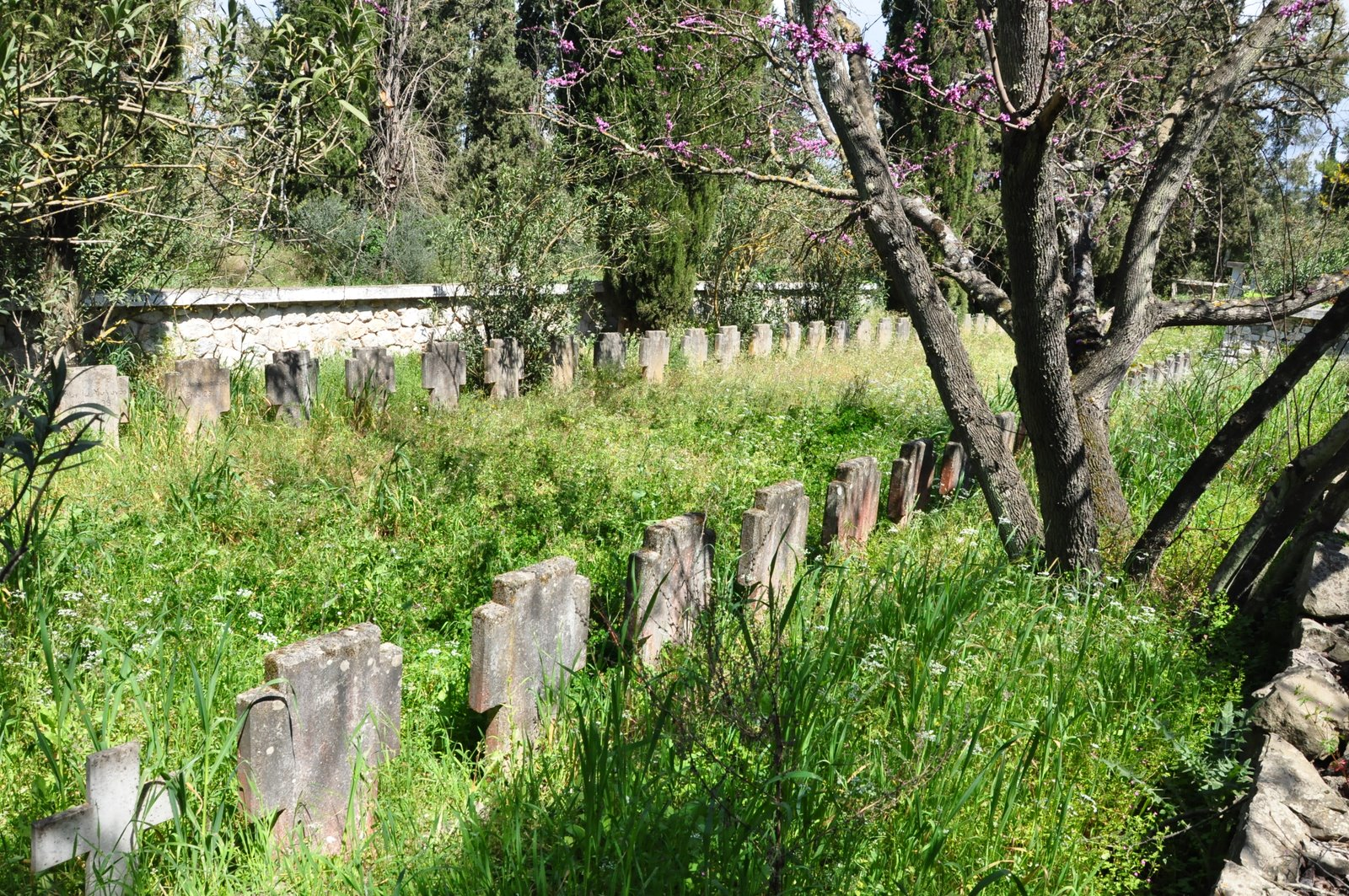
The cemetery of the victims of the massacre

In an ELAS communique of 26 September 1944, Major General Emmanouil Mantakas reported that "800 Rallides [the derogatory nickname for the Battalionists, after the collaborationist PM Ioannis Rallis] were killed", a number repeated by Stefanos Sarafis in his own book on ELAS. A Red Cross report, which generally tried to be as objective as possible, stated that the number of dead "exceeded 1,000", while a year later, the team of the noted Greek coroner Dimitrios Kapsaskis reported that it recovered 708 corpses from Meligalas.

The post-war right-wing establishment insisted on a considerably higher tally, with estimates ranging from 1,110 to over 2,500 victims. Thus the National Radical Union politician Kosmas Antonopoulos, whose father had been executed by ELAS, wrote about 2,100 executed people at Meligalas, although he cites data for 699 people. In contrast, authors sympathetic to EAM reduce the number of executions considerably: the most detailed account calculates 120 killed in action and 280–350 executed. Ilias Theodoropoulos, whose brother was killed in Meligalas, in his book (distributed by the Society of Victims of the Meligalas Well) mentions from 1,500 to over 2,000 dead, and provides a list with 1,144 names (of whom 108 from Meligalas) of those killed in action and those executed by ELAS (including some of those lynched in Kalamata, such as Perrotis). Among the victims are 18 elderly, 22 women and nine adolescents (eight boys and a girl), while all the rest—with some exceptions where age is not mentioned—are men of fighting age.

== Aftermath ==
The events at Meligalas and Kalamata were detrimental to EAM, whose leadership initially denied that any massacre had taken place, only to be forced to acknowledge it later and issue a condemnation. The more moderate leaders of EAM, Alexandros Svolos and Sarafis, insisted that they faithfully carried out the orders of the national unity government, and issued orders to "stop all executions".

These events demonstrated the willingness of ELAS to suffer significant losses in order to gain control before the arrival of British forces, and its ability to succeed in this goal led to a shift in British policy: the British liaison officers in the Peloponnese, who until then were under orders not to get involved in events, were now directed to intervene to secure the surrender, safekeeping, and delivery of the Security Battalions' weapons to British forces, to avoid them falling in the hands of ELAS. As a result, due to the mediation of British liaisons, the Red Cross, representatives of the Papandreou government, and even the local EAM authorities, in many towns of Central Greece and the Peloponnese the Security Battalions surrendered without resistance or bloodshed. At Tripolis, the negotiations between Papadongonas and 3rd ELAS Division quickly broke down. As the partisans surrounded the city, mining the roads and cutting off its water supply, and their own ammunition began to run out, the Battalionists descended into panic. Some defected, but the remainder installed a regime of terror in the city: anyone even suspected of ties to the partisans was imprisoned and Papadongonas threatened to blow them up if ELAS attacked, while his men mined the city and executed people on the streets. Nevertheless, Papadongonas was able to hold out until the end of September, when he surrendered to a British unit. There were nevertheless several cases where Battalionists, having surrendered, were killed, either by ELAS partisans, or by civilian mobs and relatives of Battalionist victims, as at Pylos or in some places in northern Greece. This was mainly the result of the widespread desire for vengeance among the population, but some cases involved the co-operation or even instigation of EAM cadres. The social polarization between EAM and its opponents, both Liberal and nationalist anti-communists, resulted in the adoption of a sort of double speak. EAM proclaimed that it supported order and the restoration of government authority, while at the same time launching a large-scale bloody extrajudicial purge, in order to secure its political domination before the arrival of the British forces, improve its negotiating position within the government, and satisfy the popular demand for revenge, so as to then demonstrate self-restraint and respect before the law. EAM's rivals on the other hand guaranteed its participation in the government while simultaneously trying to preserve the lives of the collaborationists.

In general, however, in the power vacuum in the wake of the German withdrawal, the EAM/ELAS officials who assumed control tried to impose order, preventing rioting and looting, and resisting calls for revenge by the populace. According to Mark Mazower, "ELAS rule was as orderly as was to be expected in the extraordinary circumstances that prevailed. Passions ran high, and intense suspicions were mingled with euphoria". Furthermore, EAM/ELAS was not a monolithic or tightly controlled organization, and its representatives displayed a variety of behaviour; as British observers noted, in some areas ELAS maintained order "fairly and impartially", while abusing their power in others. When British forces landed in the Peloponnese, they found the National Civil Guard, created by EAM in late summer to assume policing duties from the partisans and replace the discredited collaborationist Gendarmerie, maintained control and order. In Patras, for example, joint patrols of British soldiers and Civil Guard men were carried out until November 1944. Reprisals were also a common phenomenon in other European countries that suffered under Nazi occupation, from the mass expulsion of the Germans in eastern Europe to mass executions of collaborationists: over 10,000 in France, and between 12,000 and 20,000 in Italy.

On 26 September 1944, the Caserta Agreement was signed by Papandreou, EDES leader Napoleon Zervas, Sarafis on behalf of ELAS, and Scobie. The agreement placed ELAS and EDES under Scobie's overall command, and designated the Security Battalions as "instruments of the enemy", ordering that they were to be treated as hostile forces if they did not surrender. After the agreement was signed, Scobie ordered his officers to intervene in order to protect the Battalionists, disarming them and confining them under guard.

Following the Liberation of Greece in October 1944, on some occasions the families of Meligalas victims received pensions based on the collaborationist government's law 927/1943 on military and civil officials murdered "by anarchist elements" during the execution of their duties, a law which was retained by the post-war governments.

== Commemoration ==
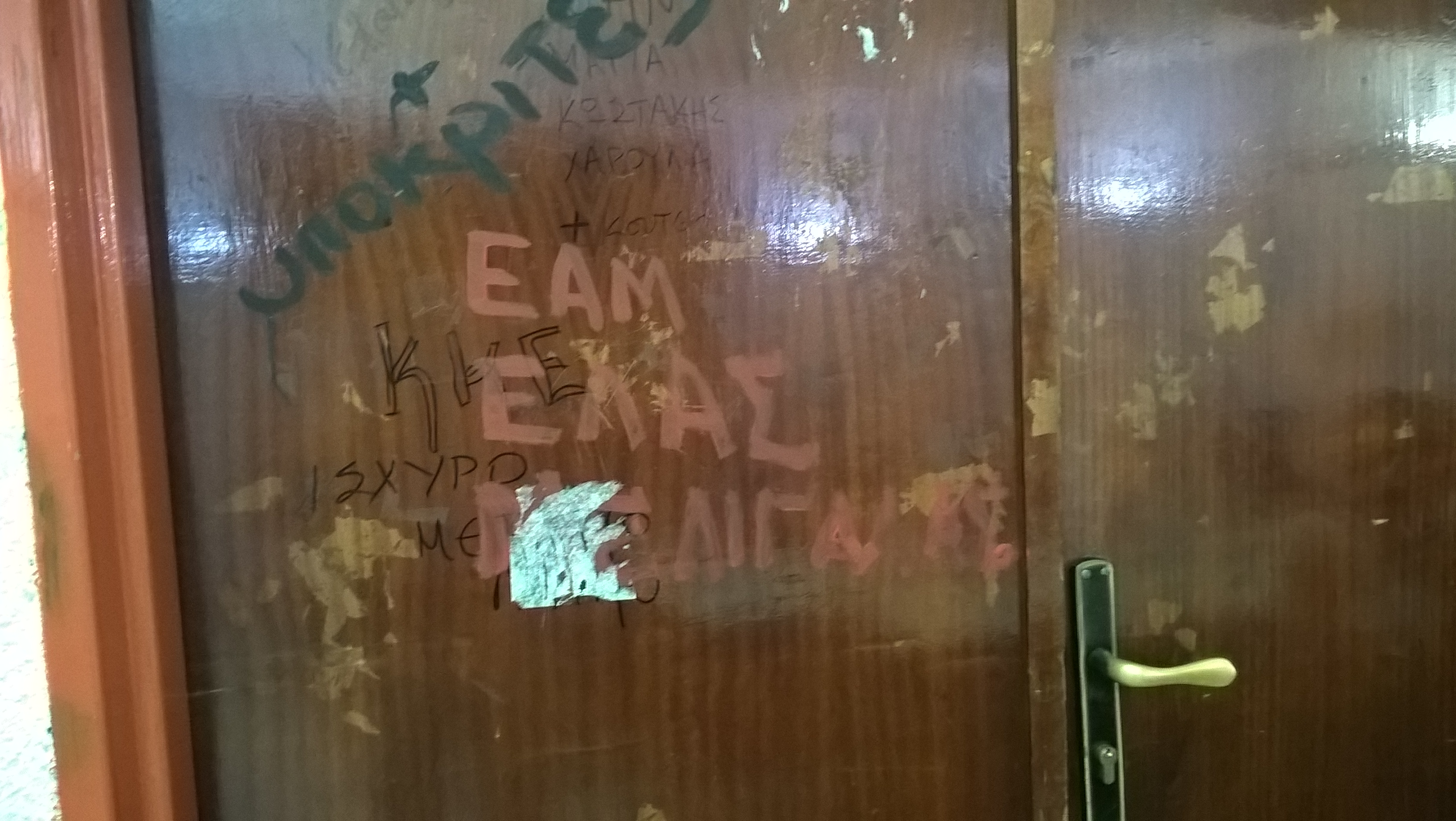
A 2011 graffito of the "EAM-ELAS-Meligalas" slogan at the Aristotle University of Thessaloniki

Since September 1945, an annual memorial service for the victims has taken place. It is organized by the local authorities and has official representation, including government members during the Greek military junta. Money collected in 1953 were used to build a cross and chapel in the vicinity of the well, while the landscaping of the surrounding area was completed under the dictatorship.

The Meligalas events were utilized politically and ideologically. The right-wing establishment after the Greek Civil War represented Meligalas as a symbol of "communist barbarity", while the Battalionists were commemorated exclusively as opponents or victims of the communists, since the post-war Greek state drew its legitimacy not from the collaborationist government, but from the government in exile. In newspaper announcements for the annual service and the speeches held there, every mention of the victims' membership in the Security Battalions was omitted; instead, they were referred to as "murdered ethnikofrones [national-minded persons]" or "patriots". After the fall of the military dictatorship and the Metapolitefsi of 1974, although the government under conservative politician Konstantinos Karamanlis enacted democratic reforms, the right clung to the anti-communist discourse of the post-civil war state and its version of history and the New Democracy government preserved commemorations it valued as symbols of a struggle for democracy and liberty against communist totalitarianism, including that of the battle at Meligalas, which were conversely regarded as remnants of civil war divisions from the left.

In 1982, following the electoral victory of the socialist PASOK the previous year, the Ministry of the Interior declared that these commemorations were promoting intolerance and for 40 years had been promoting division, and decided the cessation of official authorities' attendance at the memorial service. Its organization henceforth was undertaken by the Society of Victims of the Meligalas Well (Σύλλογος Θυμάτων Πηγάδας Μελιγαλά), established in 1980. The relative marginalization of the memorial service was accompanied by the transformation of the speeches from celebratory to apologetic for the victims' role in the Security Battalions. In recent times, the service is attended by relatives of the victims and by far-right or even neo-Nazi groups such as Golden Dawn.

In the early 1980s, the Meligalas events became a point of reference in confrontations between university students close to the "Rigas Feraios" communist youth movement and the Leftist Clusters on the one side and the right-wing ONNED youth organization and its student wing, DAP-NDFK. After the PASOK government officially recognized EAM's contribution in the Greek Resistance in 1982, "Rigas Feraios" members coined the slogan "EAM-ELAS-Meligalas" ("ΕΑΜ-ΕΛΑΣ-Μελιγαλάς") as a counter to the positive portrayal of the Battalionists by the right-wing groups. The slogan remained current in the university students' conference of 1992, following Civil War–era and anti-communist slogans used by DAP. In the late 2000s, when the political slogans and rhetoric of the 1940s increasingly resurfaced in Greek political discourse, and with Golden Dawn's entry into the Greek Parliament in 2012, the Meligalas events were re-evaluated in a positive light by anarchists as an example of militant anti-fascist action. Reference to them is now commonly combined with typically anti-authoritarian slogans.

== Sources ==
- Bærentzen, Lars (1981). "The Liberation of the Peloponnese, September 1944". In Iatrides, John O. (ed.). Greece in the 1940s: A Nation in Crisis. Modern Greek Studies Association. University Press of New England. pp. 131–144. ISBN 9780874511987.
- Chandrinos, Iasonas (2012). Το τιμωρό χέρι του λαού: Η δράση του ΕΛΑΣ και της ΟΠΛΑ στην κατεχόμενη πρωτεύουσα 1942-1944 [The Avenging Hand of the People: Activities of ELAS and OPLA in the Occupied Capital 1942-1944] (in Greek) (3rd ed.). Athens: Themelio. ISBN 9789603103882.
- Fleischer, Hagen (1982). "Νέα στοιχεία για τη σχέση γερμανικών αρχών κατοχής και ταγμάτων ασφαλείας" [New evidence on the relationship of the German occupation authorities and the Security Battalions]. Mnimon (in Greek). 8: 189–203. doi:10.12681/mnimon.231.
- Fleischer, Hagen (1995). Στέμμα και Σβάστικα: Η Ελλάδα της Κατοχής και της Αντίστασης 1941–1944 [Crown and Swastika: Greece During Occupation and Resistance 1941–1944] (in Greek). Vol. 2. Athens: Papazisis. ISBN 9789600210798.
- Fytili, Magda (2024). "Heroes or Outcasts? The Long Saga of the State's Recognition of the Greek Resistance (1944–2006)". Contemporary European History. 33 (4): 1365–1383. doi:10.1017/S0960777323000395.
- Gasparinatos, Spyros G. (1998). Η Κατοχή. Τόμος Γ': Η κατοχική περίοδος μέχρι την απελευθέρωση [The Occupation. Volume III: The occupation period until liberation] (in Greek). Athens: Sideris. ISBN 9789600801309.
- Hondros, John L. (1990). "Η Μ. Βρετανία και τα ελληνικά Τάγματα Ασφαλείας, 1943–1944" [G. Britain and the Greek Security Battalions, 1943–1944]. In Fleischer, Hagen; Svoronos, Nikos (eds.). Ελλάδα 1936–1944: Δικτατορία - Κατοχή - Αντίσταση. Πρακτικά Α' Διεθνούς Συνεδρίου Σύγχρονης Ιστορίας [Greece 1936–1944: Dictatorship – Occupation – Resistance. Proceedings of the 1st Contemporary History International Conference] (in Greek). Athens: Agricultural Bank of Greece Cultural Foundation. pp. 262–276.
- Kalyvas, Stathis (2009). "Η γεωγραφία της εμφύλιας βίας στην κατοχική Μεσσηνία: Μια ποσοτική προσέγγιση" [The geography of civil violence in occupied Messenia: A quantitative approach] (PDF). In Karakatsianis, Ioannis (ed.). Νότια Πελοπόννησος 1935–1950 [The southern Peloponnese 1935–1950] (in Greek). Athens: Alfeios, Philologists Union of Messenia. pp. 39–59. ISBN 9789606679100.
- Kousouris, Dimitris (2014). Δίκες των δοσίλογων 1944–1949: Δικαιοσύνη, συνέχεια του κράτους και εθνική μνήμη [Trials of collaborationists 1944–1949: Justice state continuity and national memory] (in Greek). Athens: Polis. ISBN 9789604354610.
- Kostopoulos, Tasos (2005). Η αυτολογοκριμένη μνήμη: Τα Τάγματα Ασφαλείας και η μεταπολεμική εθνικοφροσύνη [Self-censored memory: The Security Battalions and the post-war national-mindedness] (in Greek). Athens: philistor. ISBN 9789603690825.
- Lambatos, Gabrilis (2018). ΚΚΕ και εξουσία (1940-1944) [KKE and Power (1940–1944)] (in Greek). Athens: Metaichmio. ISBN 9786180312102.
- Lowe, Keith (2013). Savage Continent: Europe in the Aftermath of World War II. Penguin. ISBN 978-0-14-103451-5.
- Lymberatos, Michalis P. (2009). "Τα γερμανικά αντίποινα, τα Τάγματα Ασφαλείας και ο Ε.Λ.Α.Σ.: Η περίπτωση της κεντρικής και νότιας Πελοποννήσου στην Κατοχή" [German reprisals, the Security Battalions, and ELAS: The case of central and southern Peloponnese during the Occupation]. In Karakatsianis, Ioannis (ed.). Νότια Πελοπόννησος 1935–1950 [The southern Peloponnese 1935–1950] (in Greek). Athens: Alfeios, Philologists Union of Messenia. pp. 61–102. ISBN 9789606679100.
- Mazower, Mark (1993). Inside Hitler's Greece: The Experience of Occupation, 1941–44. Yale University Press. ISBN 9780300065527. JSTOR j.ctt5vkqz3.
- Mazower, Mark (2000). "Three Forms of Political Justice: Greece, 1944–1945". In Mazower, Mark (ed.). After the war was over: reconstructing the family, nation, and state in Greece, 1943–1960. Princeton, N.J.: Princeton University Press. pp. 24–41. ISBN 978-0-691-05842-9.
- Meyer, Hermann Frank (2004). Από τη Βιέννη στα Καλάβρυτα: Τα αιματηρά ίχνη της 117ης μεραρχίας καταδρομών στη Σερβία και την Ελλάδα [From Vienna to Kalavryta: The bloody trail of the 117th Jäger Division in Serbia and in Greece] (in Greek). Athens: Vivliopolion tis Estias. ISBN 9786185422424.
- Moutoulas, Pantelis (2004). Πελοπόννησος 1940–1945: Η περιπέτεια της επιβίωσης, του διχασμού και της απελευθέρωσης [The Peloponnese 1940–1945: The struggle of survival, division, and liberation] (in Greek). Athens: Vivliorama. ISBN 9789608087408.
- Papastratis, Procopis (1984). British Policy towards Greece during the Second World War 1941–1944. LSE Monographs in International Studies. Cambridge: Cambridge University Press. ISBN 9780521243421.
- Priovolos, Yannis (2018). Eθνικιστική «αντίδραση» και Τάγματα Ασφαλείας. Εμφύλιος και αντικατοχικός πόλεμος 1943-1944 [Nationalist "Reaction" and Security Battalions. Civil War and War Against the Occupation 1943–1944] (in Greek). Athens: Patakis. ISBN 9789601675619.
- Theodoropoulos, Ilias (1998). Η Πηγάδα του Μελιγαλά [The Well of Meligalas] (in Greek). Athens: Tassos Antonopoulos.
