= Battle of Kalamata (1944) =

WW II resistance action

Date	9 September 1944
Location	Kalamata, Messinia, Greece
Result	ELAS victory, executions of members of the Security Battalions by the people of the city

Belligerents
ELAS	Security Battalions; Gendarmerie

The Battle of Kalamata (Greek: Μάχη της Καλαμάτας) took place on 9 September 1944, between ELAS (the military branch of the National Liberation Front) against the collaborationist Security Battalions and the gendarmerie. It resulted in ELAS' victory and the liberation of Kalamata. After the battle, members of the Nazi collaborators were killed by the crowd.

== The battle ==
At dawn of September 9, 1944, after failed negotiations of Middle East Command for the surrender of the security battalions (the proposal was rejected by the collaborationist prefect Dimitrios Perrotis) the battle broke out. The soldiers of the battalions had taken positions in various places throughout the city, from coffee shops to barracks. The forces of ELAS firstly attacked a prison building forcing the gendarmerie that guarded it to surrender and liberating imprisoned members of ELAS that consequently took arms and joined the fight. Giannis Servos, one of the leaders of the 9th ELAS Regiment, was killed in action by the Nazi collaborators that had taken positions in the castle of Kalamata.

Gradually the positions of the security battalions fell to ELAS forces. The hotel Rex and the coffee shop Pantheon were the last positions to be eliminated, at the evening of the same day. The remaining collaborationist forces fled to Meligalas and 87 security battalionists were arrested.

== Aftermath ==
Along with the 9th Regiment, relatives of victims of the security battalions also came to the area. Residents of the city added to them after the battle to take revenge against the collaborators. The crowd proceeded to acts of violence killing two of them. After the Battle of Meligalas some days later, 18 or 19 members of the Battalions were hanged in the central square of Kalamata, including leading figures of the local Nazi collaborators Dimitrios Perrotis and Ioannis Fragkoudakis.

== Sources ==
- Moutoulas, Pantelis (2004). Πελοπόννησος 1940-1945: Η περιπέτεια της επιβίωσης, του διχασμού και της απελευθέρωσης [Peloponnese 1940-1945: The Ordeal of Survival, Discord, and Liberation]. Athens: Vivliorama. ISBN 960-8087-40-6.
- Priovolos, Giannis (2018). Εθνικιστική «αντίδραση» και Τάγματα Ασφαλείας [Nationalist "Reaction" and the Security Battalions] (in Greek). Athens: Patakis. ISBN 978-960-16-7561-9.
