= Battle of Kokkinia =

WW II resistance action

- Part of the Greek resistance
Date	4–8 March, 1944
Location	Kokkinia
Result	ELAS victory

Belligerents
(Greece) ELAS; People of Kokkinia	Wehrmacht (Greece) Hellenic Gendarmerie (Greece) Security Battalions

The Battle of Kokkinia was a battle given by Greek People's Liberation Army (ELAS) assisted by the people of Kokkinia against the Nazi occupation forces and the collaborationist Security Battalions. The battle resulted in the Nazi forces withdrawing from the area and staying away from it until August 1944, when the Executions of Kokkinia took place as a retaliation for the Battle of Kokkinia and more generally for the resistance of the working class suburbs of west Attica.

== The battle ==
In March 1944, during the German occupation of Greece, Kokkinia was attacked by Nazi and collaborationist forces. ELAS and its youth wing, EPON, resisted and after four days of battle they managed to force the German and collaborationist army to retreat. The aid of the local population was crucial. The large majority of the town's people (including men, women and children) contributed to the resistance by taking care of the wounded, searching for bullets that the resistance forces could use or arming themselves and asking to join ELAS's forces. The fighting started on 4 March and lasted until 8 March, when the German army was forced to retreat, taking 300 prisoners with them.

== Aftermath ==
The next day, on 9 March, 50 prisoners were executed in Chaidari military camp. 37 of the victims of the massacre were among the 300 Kokkinia residents arrested the previous day by the retreating German forces. The rest of the prisoners were tortured in the camp's dungeons by Gestapo agents. Kokkinia was left alone by the occupation forces for about five months until August, when mass executions were carried out by members of the Luftwaffe and their collaborators in retaliation for the resistance.
