= Civil Security Forces =

Civil Security Forces may refer to:

- Sri Lanka Civil Security Force
- Ministry of State Security (North Korea) of North Korea

== See also ==
- Civil defense
- Civil Guard (disambiguation)
