= OPLA =

OPLA may refer to:

- Allama Iqbal International Airport in Lahore, Pakistan
- Organization for the Protection of the People's Struggle, a 1940s Communist urban guerrilla group in Greece
- Office of the Principal Legal Advisor, a department of United States Immigration and Customs Enforcement
- One Piece (2023), live action Netflix series based on Eiichiro Oda's manga series of the same name.
