= Ioannis Plytzanopoulos =

Ioannis Plytzanopoulos (Greek: Ιωάννης Πλυτζανόπουλος, 1888–1950s) was a colonel in the Greek Army and leading collaborationist with Nazi Germany during the Axis occupation of Greece, as overall commander of the Security Battalions in Athens.

== Life ==
Ioannis Plytzanopoulos was born in Piraeus in 1888. He enlisted in the Greek army in January 1910, and fought in the Balkan Wars of 1912–1913. Discharged from service in June 1916, he quickly entered the Reserve Officers School and was named as a reserve infantry second lieutenant in October. Shortly after he joined the Venizelist Provisional Government of National Defence. He fought in the Macedonian Front of World War I, being admitted to the regular army in May 1918. Promoted to lieutenant in 1919, he resigned in April 1920. In 1926 he was recalled to active service with the rank of captain. In 1932 he was accused of embezzling money, but was acquitted. Despite his Venizelist past, he did not participate in the failed coup of March 1935, but resigned in August 1936 with the rank of lieutenant colonel.

When the collaborationist government recalled officers in 1943 to man the Security Battalions, Plytzanopoulos was included, with a retroactive promotion to colonel dated to 1940. From 1 May 1943, he took command of the I Evzone Security Battalion in Athens until June 1944, when he took over command of the 1st Athens Evzone Regiment, comprising all collaborationist military forces in the capital. In this capacity he participated in most of the German razzias (μπλόκα) against the mostly leftist resistance elements in various neighbourhoods of the Greek capital, and became notorious for his cruelty and fanaticism. After the liberation of Greece, in January 1945 he was suspended from active service, and automatically discharged from the army on 1 January 1946 due to reaching the age limit. Initially his discharge included a promotion to major general, but this was later removed. In the post-war trials, witnesses testified that during the Executions of Kokkinia in August 1944, Plytzanopoulos personally shot prisoners, but in the anti-communist atmosphere of the Greek Civil War, Plytzanopoulos was found not guilty due to insufficient evidence in March 1947.

== Sources ==
- Haralambidis, Menelaos (2023). Οι Δωσίλογοι: Ένοπλη, πολιτική και οικονομική συνεργασία στα χρόνια της Κατοχής [The Collaborators: Armed, Political and Economic Collaboration During the Occupation] (in Greek). Athens: Alexandreia. ISBN 978-618-223-034-3.
- Priovolos, Giannis (2018). Εθνικιστική «αντίδραση» και Τάγματα Ασφαλείας [Nationalist "Reaction" and the Security Battalions] (in Greek). Athens: Patakis. ISBN 978-960-16-7561-9.
- Μεγάλη Στρατιωτικὴ καὶ Ναυτικὴ Ἐγκυκλοπαιδεία. Tόμος Πέμπτος: Νάβα–Σαρακηνοί [Great Military and Naval Encyclopaedia. Volume V: Nave–Saracens] (in Greek). Athens: Ἔκδοσις Μεγάλης Στρατιωτικῆς καὶ Ναυτικῆς Ἐγκυκλοπαιδείας. 1930. p. 490. OCLC 31255024.
