= Civil Guard =

Civil Guard refers to various policing organisations:

== Current ==
- Civil Guard (Spain), Spanish national gendarmerie force founded in 1844.
- Garda Síochána, Irish national police force founded in 1922.
- Civil Guard (Israel), Israeli volunteer police reserve.
- Municipal Civil Guard (Brazil), Municipal law enforcement corporations in Brazil.

== Historic Civil Guards now abolished ==
- Gardes Civiles Indigenes, fully armed and equipped, and full time paramilitary forces raised in some French colonies for service in that colony.
- Garde Civique of Belgium, a historic militia maintained until 1914.
- Civil Guard (Costa Rica), fully merged into the Fuerza Pública.
- Civil Guard (Peru), police force of Peru in 1924.
- Civil Guard (Colombia), created in 1902.
- Civil Guard (El Salvador), created in 1867, which then gave way to the National Guard in 1912.
- Civil Guard (Honduras), a militarized police commanded directly by President Ramón Villeda Morales.
- Civil Guard Association for a Better Future, Hungarian anti-Roma organization.
- Civil Guard (Panama) (abolished)
- Civil Guard (Philippines), a local gendarmerie organized under the auspices of the Spanish colonial authorities.
- Civil Guard (Laos), a Laotian militia organized by the anti-French Lao Issara nationalists between 1945-46.
- Civil Guard (South Vietnam), merged into the South Vietnamese Popular Force and the South Vietnamese Regional Force.
- Gwardya Sibil (Philippine resistance network), a civilian underground network operating during World War II.
- Suojeluskunta, a Finnish militia for which "Civil Guard" is one of the many English translations.
- Civil Guard (Zaire), created in 1984 and disestablished in 1997.
- National Civil Guard and the People's Civil Guard, security forces of the Communist Party of Greece between 1944-45 and 1947-49 respectively.

== See also ==
- Civic Guard (disambiguation)
- Guard (disambiguation)
- Guardia (disambiguation)
- National Guard
- Home Guard
