= People's Civil Guard =

Former Greek Security Force

The People's Civil Guard (Greek: Λαϊκή Πολιτοφυλακή, ΛΠ, Laïkí Politofylakí), founded in 1947, was the security force of the Communist Party of Greece (KKE) during the Greek Civil War (1946–49). It was the police counterpart of the Democratic Army of Greece (DSE), KKE's military force. It was actually the successor of the National Civil Guard, which was the successor of the Organization for the Protection of the People's Struggle (OPLA).

The People's Civil Guard included both men and women; all of them were volunteers and ideologically dedicated to the Communist Party, a situation different from that of the DSE, which engaged in forced recruitment, especially in the last stages of the Civil War.

In June 1948, the KKE leadership published a booklet to be studied by the civil guards, "Lessons of Popular Civil Guard" (Μαθήματα Λαϊκής Πολιτοφυλακής, Mathímata Laïkís Politofylakís), where it was emphasized that the Popular Civil Guard was a security force "of a new type", different from the Greek Gendarmerie and the Cities Police of the Greek government, whose aim was to serve the people.

Initially the People's Civil Guard was commanded by Stephanos Papayannis, a former Captain of the Greek Army who had joined the Communist Party during World War II, and had fought in the Greek Resistance against the Nazis; later however, Vasilis Bartziotas, a Communist Party cadre took command.

In northern Greece, it was also named and it was much known as Close Self-Defense (Greek: Στενή Αυτοάμυνα).
