= Roundup (police action) =

Mass arrest/detainment targeting a group

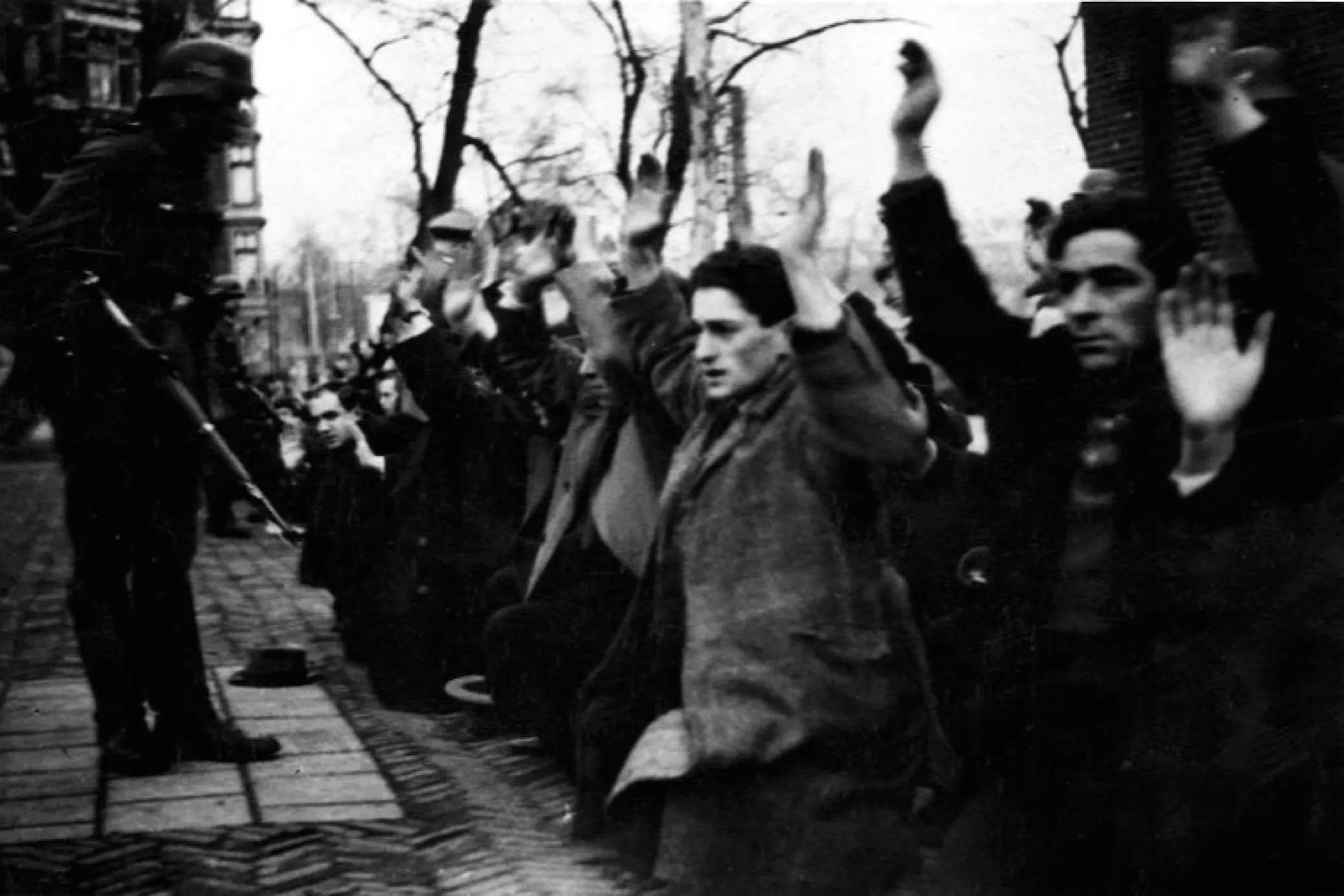
Roundup of Jews by the Nazi occupiers in Amsterdam in February 1941.

A roundup is a police/military operation of interpellation and arrest of people taken at random from a public place, or targeting a particular population by ethnicity, appearance, or other perceived membership in a targeted group. To ensure operational success, organizers rely on the element of surprise in order to reduce the risk of evasion as much as possible. When the operation involves large numbers of individuals not targeted for any perceived group membership, it may be called a mass arrest.

== Roma in Europe ==
=== Spanish Monarchy ===
The Great Gypsy Round-up was a raid authorized and organized by the Spanish Monarchy that led to the arrest of all gypsies (Romani) in the region, and their imprisonment in labor camps. The raid was approved by King Ferdinand VI of Spain, was organized by the Marquis of Ensenada, and was set in motion simultaneously across Spain on 30 July 1749.

== World War II ==
=== Belgium ===
The Jewish population of Belgium was rounded up four times during the Second World War. The first two roundups took place on 15 and 28 August 1942 in Antwerp under the command of SS NCO Erich Holm. They were conducted by feldgendarmes, German and Flemish SS officers, and Belgian police. A third roundup took place on 11 September 1942. In Brussels, the situation was different and the mayor, Jules Coelst, who had already opposed the Germans on the issue of the compulsory wearing of the Jewish yellow badge, an order that he refused to enforce, arguing that there was a lack of manpower so that his police would not be involved in the roundups. A single nighttime roundup took place in Brussels on 3 September 1942. Liège and Charleroi each also had a single roundup in August and September 1942.

=== Germany ===
As part of the implementation of the Nazi Final Solution, the Gestapo rounded up Jews in Germany and forced them into confined ghettos, while seizing their homes and possessions.

=== France ===
Vichy French police carried out numerous roundups (rafles) of Jews during World War II, including the Green ticket roundup in May 1941, the round-up in the 11th arrondissement of Paris in August 1941 in which 4,200 persons were arrested and interned at Drancy, the massive Vélodrome d'Hiver round-up in 1942 in which over 13,000 Jews were arrested, the rafle of Clermont-Ferrand (25 November 1943), and the roundup in the Old Port of Marseille in 1943. Almost all of those arrested were deported to Auschwitz or other death camps.

=== Poland ===
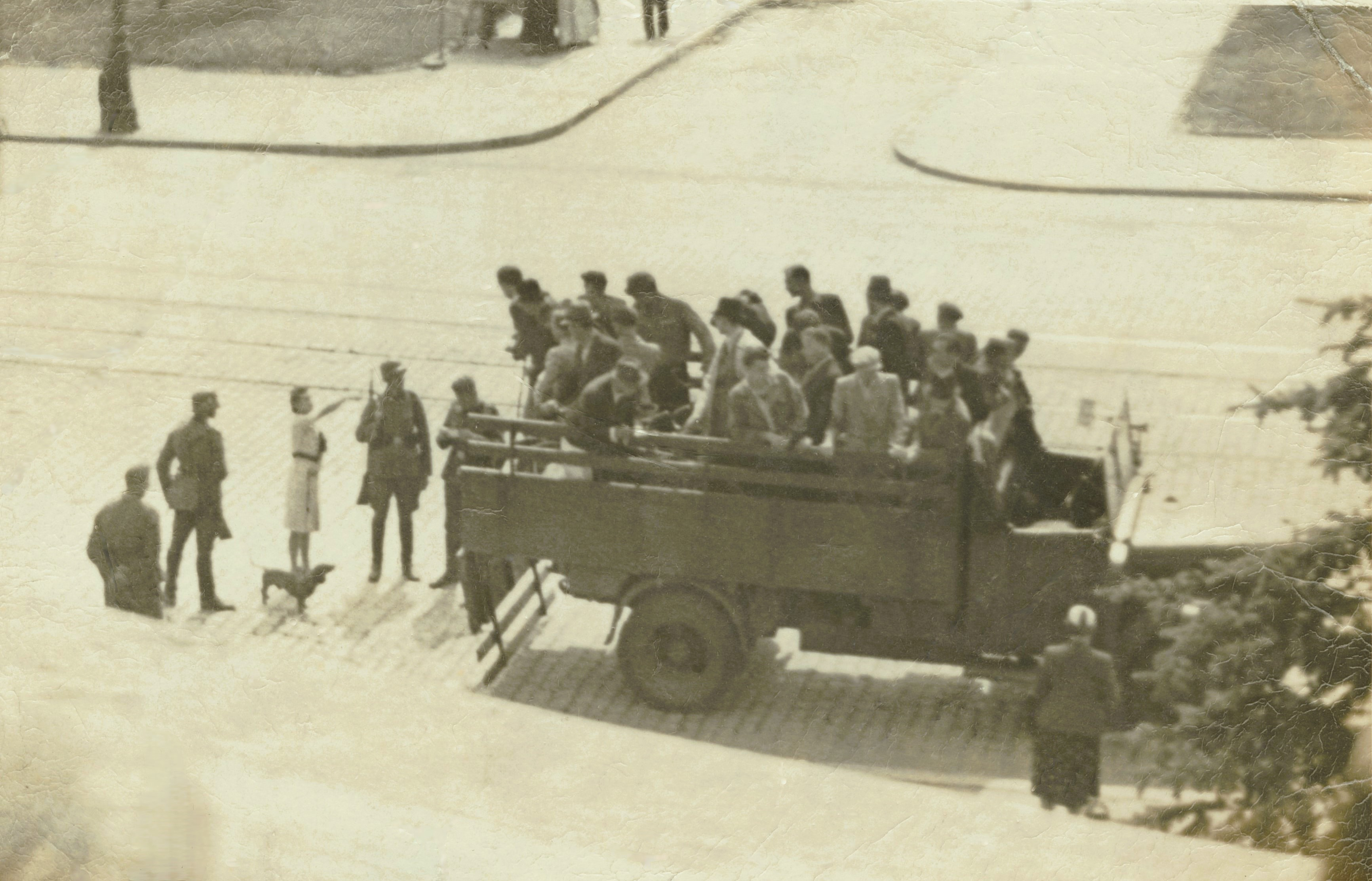
1941 roundup in Warsaw's Żoliborz district

In Poland, German SS, Wehrmacht, and Gestapo teams rounded up civilians on the streets of Polish cities. Those arrested were in most cases chosen at random from among passers-by or inhabitants of city quarters surrounded by German forces prior to the action.

Known as a łapanka, the term usually refers to the action of rounding up and arresting a number of random people. Those caught in a łapanka were either taken hostage, arrested, sent to labor camps or concentration camps, or summarily executed.

Those caught in roundups were most often sent to slave labour in Nazi Germany, but some were also taken as hostages or executed in reprisal actions; imprisoned and sent to concentration camps or summarily executed in numerous ethnic-cleansing operations.

==== Bialystok ====
In February 1943, 10,000 Jews from the Białystok Ghetto were rounded up and sent aboard Holocaust trains to their deaths at the Treblinka extermination camp.

== Cambodia ==
The state of Chinese Cambodians during the Khmer Rouge regime was alleged to be "the worst disaster ever to befall any ethnic Chinese community in Southeast Asia." Hundreds of Cham, Chinese and Khmer families were rounded up in 1978 and told that they were to be resettled, but were actually executed. At the beginning of the Khmer Rouge regime in 1975, there were 425,000 ethnic Chinese in Cambodia; by the end of 1979 there were just 200,000 stuck at Thai refugee camps or Cambodia. 170,000 Chinese fled Cambodia to Vietnam while others were repatriated.

== Immigrants ==
=== Belgium ===
As a result of the European migrant crisis, Maximilian Park in Brussels became a refugee camp, a meeting place for migrants, volunteers and associations since 2015.

In July 2017, the citizen platform of support for refugees denounced raids which had been organized in May and June. This was also the case of Le Ciré, a non-profit association created in 1954 whose goal is to allow refugees and foreigners to learn about the economic, social, and cultural life of the country in order to facilitate their integration in Belgium.

Numerous accounts report recurrent raids, during which numerous irregularities were noted, such as the unwarranted use of force on weak and/or elderly migrants as well as on volunteer citizens leading to several hundred complaints being filed with Committee P, the police oversight committee.

=== United States ===
In 1997, local police and U.S. federal authorities patrolled the streets of Chandler, Arizona and stopped hundreds of suspected Hispanic people based on their physical appearance, demanded proof of citizenship, and arrested those who could not provide it. A total of 432 illegal immigrants were arrested in Chandler and later deported.

== See also ==
- Anti-gay purges in Chechnya
- Executions of Kokkinia
- The Holocaust in Italy
- Internment of Japanese Americans
- List of Jewish ghettos in German-occupied Poland
- Nazi ghettos
- Operation Wetback
- Pope Pius XII and the raid on the Roman ghetto
- Raid of the Ghetto of Rome
- Rue Sainte-Catherine Roundup

== Works cited ==
- Bigaré, Aurélie (1 October 2015). "Une journée avec Médecins du Monde (MdM) au camp de réfugiés du parc Maximilien à Bruxelles" [A day with Médecins du Monde (MdM) at the Maximilian Park refugee camp in Brussels]. Médecine pour le Peuple (in French).
- "Crise de l'accueil en Belgique: Mais qui sont ces migrants?" [Belgium's reception crisis: Who are these migrants?]. Caritas International Belgium (in Belgian French). 31 August 2015.
- Diamant, David (1977). Le billet vert: la vie et la résistance à Pithiviers et Beaune-la-Rolande, camps pour juifs, camps pour chrétiens, camps pour patriotes [The green ticket: life and resistance in Pithiviers and Beaune-la-Rolande, camps for Jews, camps for Christians, camps for patriots] (in French). Éditions Renouveau.
- Goethem, Herman Van (2006). "La convention de La Haye, la collaboration administrative en Belgique et la persécution des Juifs à Anvers, 1940-1942" [The Hague Convention, administrative collaboration in Belgium and the persecution of Jews in Antwerp, 1940-1942] (PDF). Cahiers d'Histoire du Temps présent (17).
- Aron, Paul; Gotovitch, José (2008). Dictionnaire de la seconde guerre mondiale en Belgique [Dictionary of the Second World War in Belgium] (in French). Brussels: André Versaille. ISBN 978-2-87495-001-8.
- Ghyselings, Marise (16 October 2017). "Rafle au Parc Maximilien : Après le choc, la solidarité (et la colère) des citoyens" [Rafle au Parc Maximilien : Après le choc, la solidarité (et la colère) des citoyens]. Paris Match.be (in French).
- "Migrants et répression : Le Ciré dénonce des rafles" [Migrants and repression: Ciré denounces raids]. Conseil bruxellois de Coordination sociale (in French). 17 June 2021.
- Loisel, Eléonore (6 July 2017). "Retour des migrants au parc Maximilien après l'hiver" [Return of migrants to Maximilian Park after winter]. Le Vif (in French).
- Rosenberg, Pnina (10 September 2018). "Yiddish Theatre in the camps of the Occupied Zone". In Dalinger, Brigitte; Zangl, Veronika (eds.). Theater unter NS-Herrschaft: Theatre under Pressure [Theatre under NS rule: Theatre under Pressure]. Theater - Film - Medien (Print) #2. Göttingen: V&R Unipress. p. 297. ISBN 978-3-8470-0642-8. OCLC 1135506612.
- "Des centaines de migrants dorment au parc Maximilien à Bruxelles" [Hundreds of migrants sleep in Maximilian Park in Brussels]. RTBF Info (in French). 6 July 2017.
- "Près de 300 citoyens ont déposé plainte au Comité P pour les migrants du parc Maximilien" [Nearly 300 citizens filed a complaint with Committee P for the Maximilian Park migrants]. RTBF Info (in French). 27 November 2017.
- Steinberg, Maxime [in French] (2004). La persécution des Juifs en Belgique (1940-1945) [The Persecution of the Jews in Belgium]. fr:Éditions Complexe. ISBN 978-2-8048-0026-0.
- Zuccotti, Susan (1999), "5 Roundups and Deportations", The Holocaust, the French, and the Jews, Lincoln, Nebraska: U of Nebraska Press, p. 81, ISBN 0-8032-9914-1
