= Organization for the Protection of the People's Struggle =

Greek Communist special division

The Organization for the Protection of the People's Struggle (Greek: Οργάνωση Περιφρούρησης Λαϊκού Αγώνα, abbreviated ΟΠΛΑ – OPLA, an acronym meaning "weapons" in Greek) was a special division of the Communist Party of Greece (KKE) during the Axis Occupation of Greece in World War II.

== History ==
Although security groups had operated earlier, OPLA officially first appeared in November 1943 through an anti-Occupation announcement.

Officially, it was a semi-autonomous part of the broader National Liberation Front (EAM). In fact, it was not controlled by EAM, but directly by the Politburo of the KKE. It can be described as a paramilitary security force. It operated in the cities, and its purpose was the self-defense of the members of the National Liberation Front and its affiliated organizations from the German occupation authorities and the collaborationist government and its organs, the Police, the Gendarmerie (especially its notorious branch named as Special Security, expertised at the anti-communistic struggle) and the Security Battalions. It proved to be very successful in assassinating commanders of the Security Battalions and other armed governmental forces. However, it also became involved in political assassinations of political opponents of the KKE on both ends of the political spectrum, such as Trotskyites and Archeio-Marxists. As a result, the activities of the OPLA are a subject of heated debate even today.

In April 1944, it was renamed as National Civil Guard, though members of OPLA continued operations.

The organization was also active during the December 1944 events in Athens. Hundreds of executions of anti-communists or collaborators took place in the vicinity of the ULEN refineries.

Among its victims was also the well-known actress Eleni Papadaki.

In 1947, during the subsequent Greek Civil War, it was renamed as "People's Civil Guard". It acted especially in Thessaloniki and Northern Greece in 1946–1947 (in these regions the name of the organization was "Close Self-Defense", Στενή Αυτοάμυνα in Greek). One of its more notable later actions was the assassination of Justice Minister Christos Ladas (who had signed the execution of hundreds of communists) in Athens on 1 May 1948, by OPLA and KKE member Efstratios (Stratos) Moutsogiannis. In Macedonia and Epirus during the Civil War, the OPLA assassinated many high-ranking officers of the Greek Gendarmerie.

During the Greek Civil War, OPLA turned the monastery of St. George in Feneos into a concentration camp and killing ground for those they deemed "reactionaries". The concentration camp was well-organized for mass killings, with 6-7 resident killers that worked around the clock in busy times. It is believed that hundreds were killed.
