= Dimitrios Deligeorgis =

Greek revolutionary and politician (1785/88–1860)

Demetrios Deligiorgis Δημήτριος Δεληγεώργης
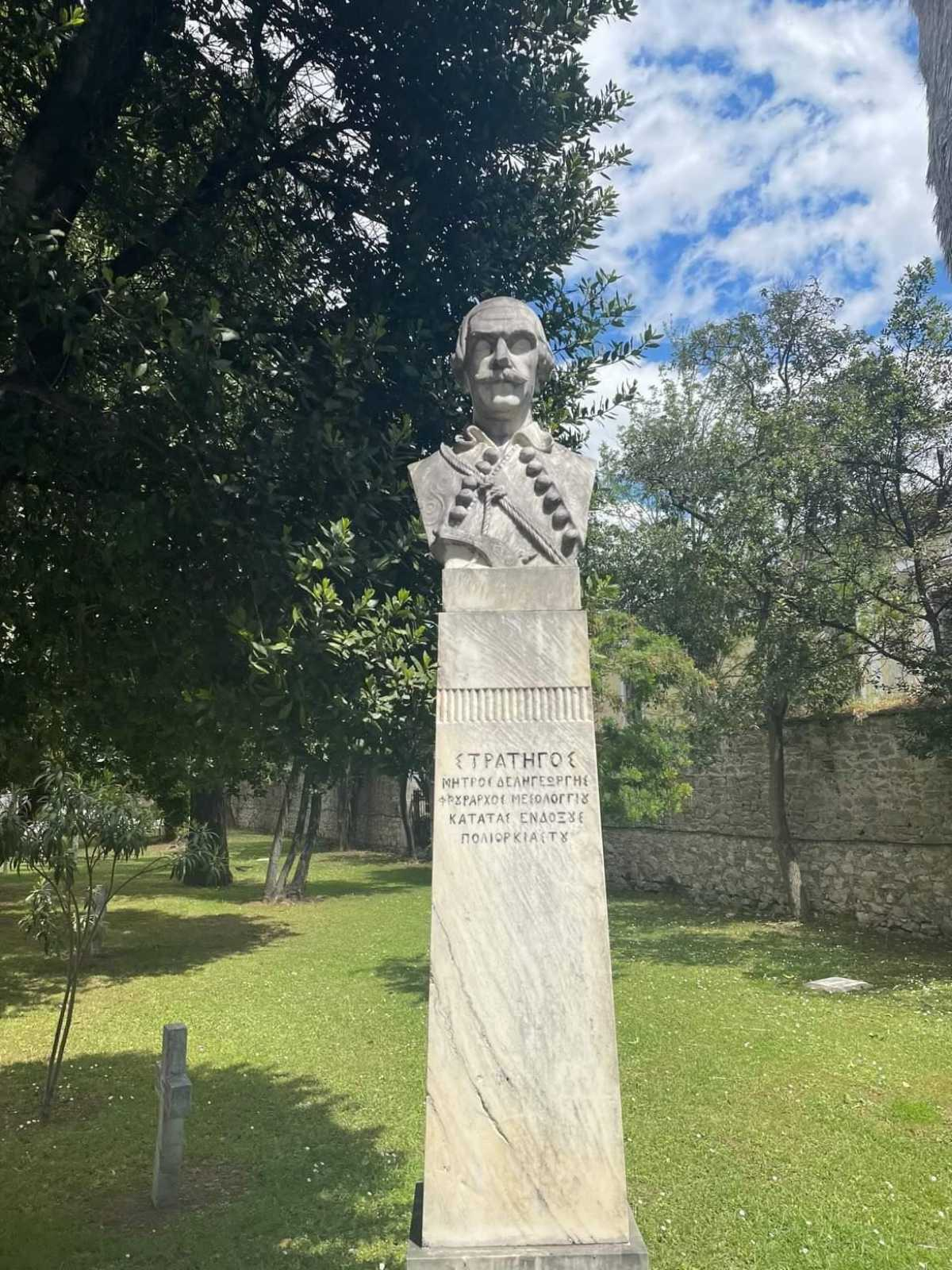
- Marble bust of Dimitrios Deligeorgis
- Born: 1785 or 1788
- Died: 1860 (aged 74–75); Athens, Greece

Demetrios (Mitros) Deligiorgis (Greek: Δημήτριος Δεληγεώργης, 1785/88–1860) was a Greek revolutionary and politician during the Greek War of Independence.

== Biography ==
Before the outbreak of the Greek War of Independence, Deligiorgis worked as a secretary to the powerful Ali Pasha of Ioannina; in documents of the period his also referred to under the name Deligeorgopoulos or Deligiorgopoulos. When the War of Independence broke out in 1821, he was in Preveza, and was soon invited by the provisional administration to become a member of the new government in Missolonghi.

Deligiorgis formed his own military body, spending large part of his personal fortune, and served as a battery commander during the First Siege of Missolonghi. He then became garrison commandant of the city. During the final sally of the garrison in the Third Siege of Missolonghi, he managed to escape and fled to Nafplion. He then served as garrison commandant of Bourtzi fortress in Nafplion. Following the establishment of the Kingdom of Greece, Deligiorgis established close links with the new court of King Otto, who esteemed him highly. In the 1847 elections he was elected to parliament for Missolonghi. He was also a strong candidate for a cabinet position, but for the strongly anti-Ottonian stance of his son, Epameinondas Deligiorgis. Otto also appointed him a colonel in the Phalanx (a body made up of veteran leaders of the War of Independence), and in 1854 he was appointed commander of the Greek Gendarmerie.

== Family ==
Deligeorgis was married to Chrysaido Benedetou (1785–1860), a daughter of a wealthy family. Her dowry, as well as estates given by the state for his service during the War of Independence, formed the basis of a considerable landed fortune. The couple had five children:

- Pinelopi, who married the doctor Athanasios Drosinis of Missolonghi (died 1885), but had no children
- Maria
- Epameinondas (1829–1879), who became a politician and served six times as Prime Minister of Greece
- Themistoklis (born 1836), who took over his father's estates
- Leonidas (1839–1928), who became a politician and served as Foreign Minister
