= Democratic Army of Greece =

Military force of the Communist Party of Greece during the Greek Civil War (1946-49)

Democratic Army of Greece Δημοκρατικός Στρατός Ελλάδας
- Badge of the DSE. The letter Delta stands for Demokratia, meaning "Democracy" and "Republic"
- Leaders: Nikos Zachariadis (Gen. Sec. of the KKE); Markos Vafiadis (military leader, President of the Provisional Government)
- Founded: 28 October 1946 (founded); 27 December 1946 (renamed)
- Dates active: 1946–1949
- Allegiance: KKE; Democratic Government (from 1947)
- Ideology: Communism; Republicanism; Left-wing nationalism Anti-fascism
- Political position: Far-left
- Wars: Greek Civil War

The Democratic Army of Greece (Greek: Δημοκρατικός Στρατός Ελλάδας, ΔΣΕ; Dimokratikós Stratós Elládas, DSE), also called the Democratic Army and known by its acronym DSE, was the army founded by the Communist Party of Greece (KKE), on 28 October 1946, as the General Headquarters of Partisans, which was renamed to Democratic Army of Greece on 27 December 1946. It served as the army of the Provisional Democratic Government during the Greek Civil War (1946–1949). At its height, it had a strength of around 50,000 men and women. The DSE was backed by the Popular Civil Guard (Λαϊκή Πολιτοφυλακή, ΛΠ), the KKE's security police force.

One of the flags used by the Greek Democratic Army during the Greek Civil War, from 1946 to 1949.

== History ==
=== Persecution after the Dekemvriana ===
After the liberation of Greece from the Axis occupation, the Dekemvriana and the Varkiza Agreement, ELAS, the armed wing of the EAM (which was dominated by communists and was the main partisan army in the country) agreed to a disarmament, and the persecution of left wing citizens, communists and officials of EAM, began. At the time, there were 166 different anti-communist groups, such as those of Sourlas and Kalabalikis in Thessaly, and Papadopoulos in Macedonia.

This persecution, which became known as the White Terror, saw Greek leftists targeted by right-wing paramilitaries and government security forces. DSE archives indicated that by 31 March 1946, 1,289 suspected Greek communists had been killed, 6,671 had been wounded, 84,931 had been arrested, 165 been raped, and the property of 18,767 were looted; the number of suspected communists who were imprisoned was in excess of 30,000. While British involvement in directly supporting far-right paramilitaries remains a controversial issue in Greek historiography and has not been conclusively proven, it is certain that British authorities tolerated their activities and made no effort to prevent the persecution of Greek leftists.

=== Civil War ===
After the 2nd Congress of the KKE in February 1946, approximately 250 leftist self-defence militias, known as Groups of Democratic Armed Persecuted Fighters (ODEKA), were formed across Greece, totaling some 3,000 men. Most of the militiamen were former ELAS fighters. By April, ODEKA membership had grown to 4,400 fighters, reaching 5,400 fighters by August. Between April and June 1946, ODEKA fighters took part in 72 clashes, mainly targeting the Greek Gendarmerie and right wing paramilitary squads. The first coordinated attack by ODEKA took place on the night of 30/31 March 1946 when a band of 33 guerillas struck the Gendarmerie station at Litochoro, killing 13 gendarmes. The Battle of Litochoro marked the beginning of the third phase of the Greek Civil War.

Organization and military bases of the Democratic Army, as well as entry routes to Greece (legend in Greek)

The KKE led the armed struggle through the General Headquarters of Partisans, created on 28 October 1946 and headed by Markos Vafiadis. Its nineteenth order, issued on 27 December 1946, officially set the name of the partisan forces as Democratic Army of Greece (DSE). The relevant order included the following comment regarding the DSE: "It is the national people's revolutionary army of the new Democratic Greece and fights with gun in hand for our National independence and for People's Democracy."

In 1947, the KKE and the Democratic Army formed the "Provisional Democratic Government" ("Mountain Government") under the premiership of Markos Vafiadis. After this, the KKE was outlawed.

As well as issues regarding the war effort, the Provisional Government had to deal with issues regarding the "People's Law" in the territories controlled by the DSE. These had to do with the judicial, financial, and political systems. As the Provisional Government was based on political forces which aimed to establish a socialist state, its decisions were driven by this political agenda. The self-determination of national minorities living in Greece was one priority. The Provisional Government and the KKE intended to establish a People's Republic of Greece in which all nationalities would work together in a Socialist state. An article written by Nikos Zachariadis expressed the KKE's strategy after the envisioned victory of the Democratic Army of Greece regarding what was then known as the "Macedonian Issue": "The Macedonian people will acquire an independent, united state with a coequal position within the family of free peoples' republics within the Balkans, within the family of Peoples' Republics to which the Greek people will belong. The Macedonian people are today fighting for this independent united state with a coequal position and is helping the DSE with all its soul...." The policy of self-determination for Macedonia within a People's Republic was reiterated during the 5th Plenum of the Central Committee of the KKE held in January 1949, which declared that the "Macedonian people participating in the liberation struggle would find their full national re-establishment as they want giving their blood for this acquisition... Macedonian Communists should pay great attentions to foreign chauvinist and counteractive elements that want to break the unity between the Greek and Macedonian people. This will only serve the monarcho-fascists and British imperialism...."

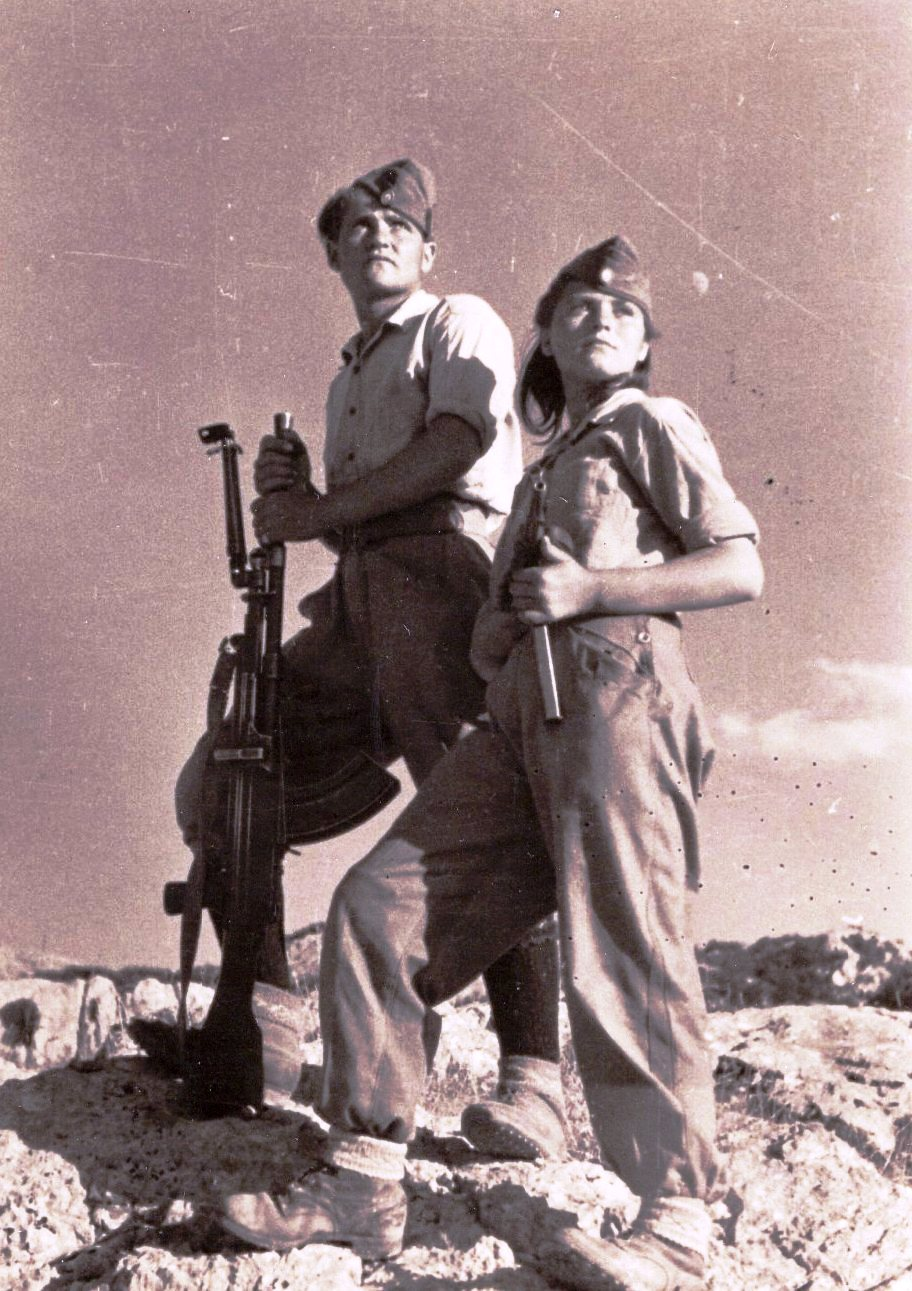
Fighters of the Democratic Army of Greece

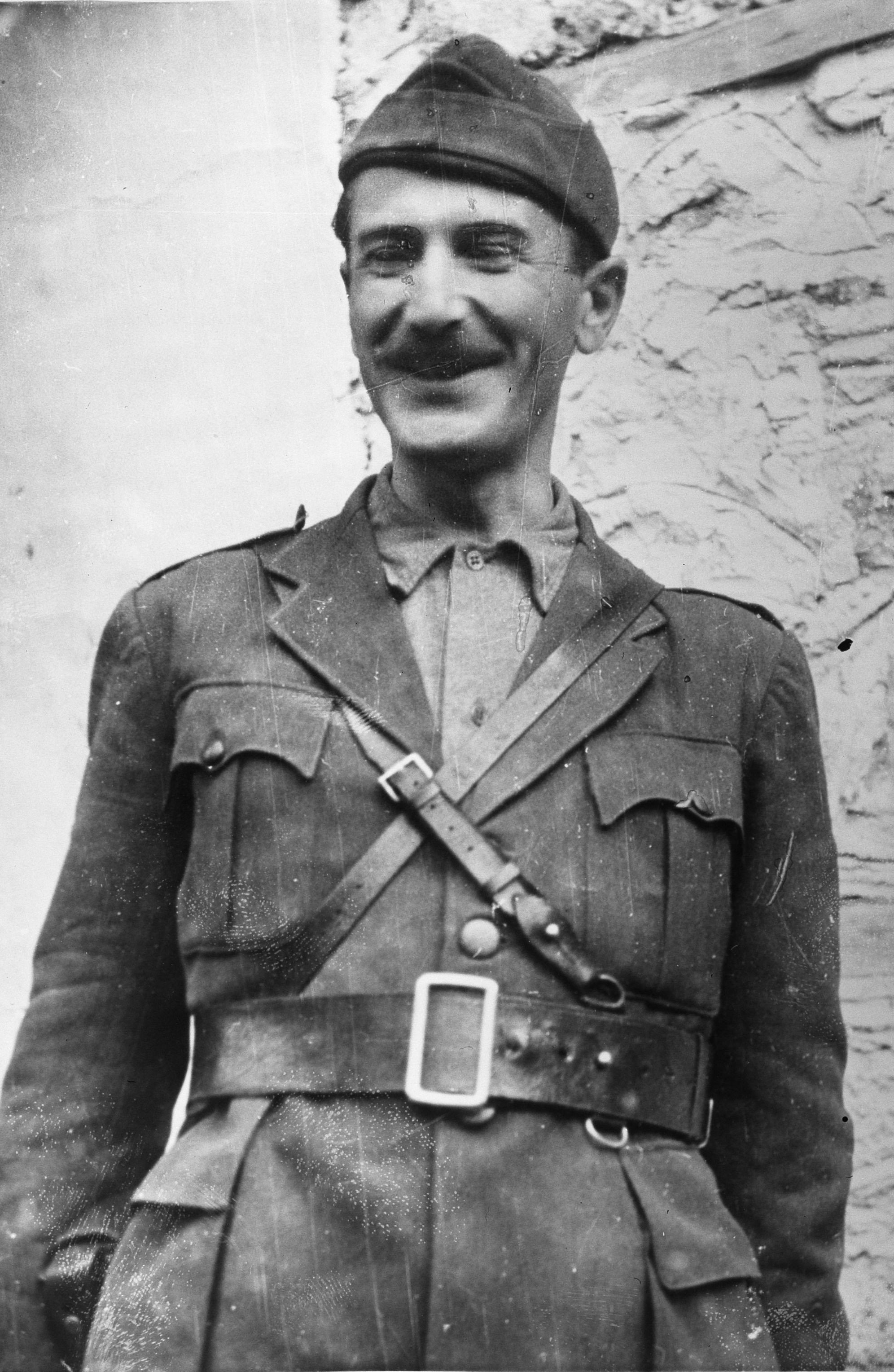
Markos Vafeiadis, commander-in-chief of DSE

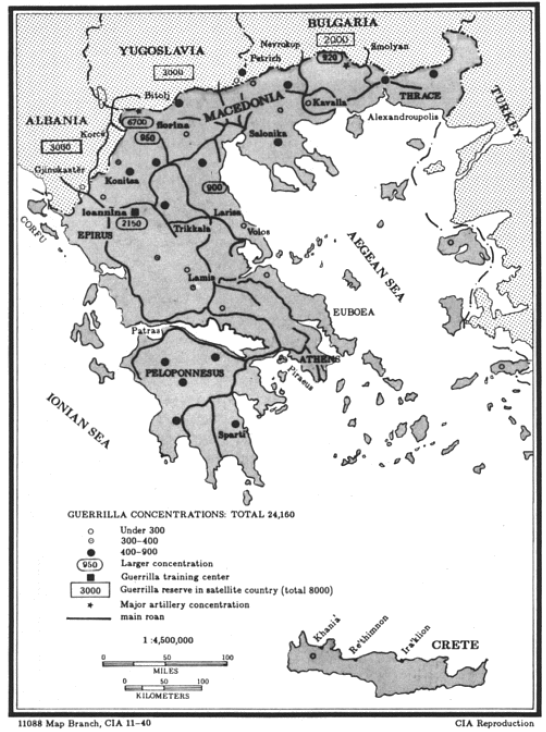
Democratic Army deployment in 1948

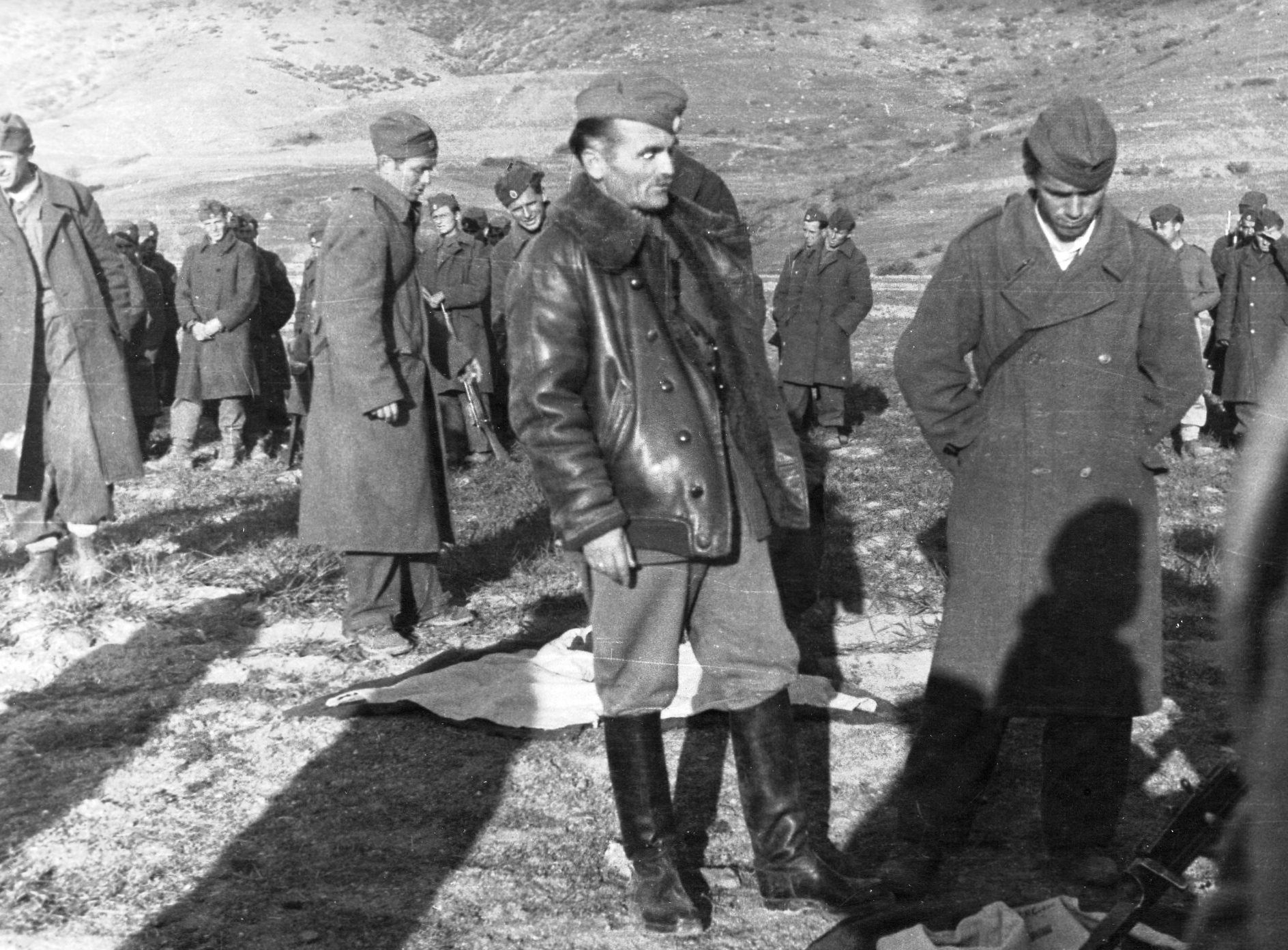
Fighters of the Democratic Army

The Provisional Government never achieved international recognition. During the first two years, from 1946 to the beginning of 1948, it managed to control large rural areas but no major town. At the same time, the Hellenic Army, advised by the British up to 1947 and afterwards by US military delegation led by General James Van Fleet, US Army, established the Greek government's position in the rest of the country as well as internationally.

After the fatal blow in early 1948, when DSE's III Brigade numbering 20,000 men and women was completely wiped out, DSE lost support in southern Greece as well as the political and economic control of a huge area. That was the beginning of the end of the Greek Civil War. At the same time, the efforts of the HQ of DSE to capture and hold a major town in the North such as Konitsa or Florina led to catastrophic defeat of the partisan army, which never recovered. On the other hand, the DSE did manage to achieve some military victories in 1948 and early 1949, in the battles of Karpenisi, Naousa, and Karditsa. At the same time, DSE had a huge problem regarding reserves. Most of the men and women capable and willing to join its ranks were imprisoned or unable to reach areas controlled by DSE.

One of the biggest battles of the three-year Greek Civil War took place in the Grammos mountains in 1948. The operation took place after the Hellenic Army had secured the Peloponnese, where it managed to defeat the DSE's III Division, numbering 20,000 fighters. In the battle of Grammos, forces of the Hellenic Army, with the codename Operation Koronis, deployed 70,000 troops, while the DSE had 12,000 fighters. The battle lasted from 16 June until 21 August 1948. On that day, DSE forces, after hard fight, retreated into Albanian territory and reformed towards Vitsi. The maneuver from Grammos to Vitsi is considered one of the most important tactical actions of DSE during the war, from a military point of view.

Towards the end of August 1949, the Hellenic Army, under the leadership of Alexander Papagos, deployed 180,000 troops, and achieved the defeat of the DSE army of about 7,000 fighters on the Grammos-Vitsi front.

=== Refugees ===
After this defeat, the DSE fighters crossed the border into Albania and scattered to camps all over the newly founded Socialist Republics, with the main body of the fighters camped in Tashkent, the capital of Uzbekistan in the USSR.

== Aftermath ==
The post-Civil War era left a country in ruins. Many of the nation's youth were either killed on the battlefield, imprisoned or became political refugees. The political situation was quite unstable for most of the next two decades – the decisive factor leading to the Greek military junta of 1967–1974. The ghost of the Civil War haunted Greece for many years after.

After the Metapolitefsi KKE was legalized in 1974. In 1981, when PASOK came to power in Greece following a long period of right-wing dominance, the political refugees of the DSE were finally given permission to return to their homeland (Macedonian Slavs excluded) by the new Interior Minister, George Gennimatas. Markos Vafiadis also returned to Greece and was elected a Member of Parliament for PASOK. In 1989, the Greek Parliament voted unanimously a law that declared the three-year war of 1946–1949 as formally having been the "Greek Civil War" and accepted the former "Communist Bandits" as "Fighters of DSE", giving some of them privileges of pension.

== Awards and decorations ==
On 4 April 1948, the Provisional Democratic Government's Law Number 13 established awards and decorations in order to mark extraordinary bravery and courage, as well as distinguished service during times of war by individual DSE soldiers and well as units. The aforementioned law established the following awards and decorations:

- Medal of Military Valor Grade A and B
- Electra Medal
- Sniper Distinguished Service Medal
- Saboteur Distinguished Service Medal
- Distinguished Service in an Occupied City Medal
- Artillery Distinguished Service Medal
- Navy Distinguished Service Medal
- Distinguished Service in the Monarchist-Fascist Army Medal
- Aircraft Destruction Medal
- Tank Destruction Medal
- Distinguished Scouting Service Medal
- Wound Badge
- Distinction for Past Service in ELAS
- Seniority Distinction

Α Provisional Democratic Government decree dating to 24 March 1949, awarded 33 participants of the Battle of Litochoro with the Medal of Military Valor which bore the inscription "LITOCHORO". A total of 970 DSE members received medals during the course of the civil war, including 557 men and 413 women.

== The oath of the DSE fighter ==
The following text was the oath that DSE members had to swear and abide by. During enrollment, the member would swear:

“I, child of the People of Greece and fighter of the DSE, swear: To fight with a gun in hand, to spill my blood and give my own life, in order to kick every last foreign occupier from the soil of my country. To eliminate every trace of fascism. To secure and defend the national independence and territorial integrity of my country. To secure and defend Democracy, the honor, the labor, the property and progress of my people.

I swear to be a good, brave and obedient soldier, to execute all the orders of my superiors, to abide by all clauses of the bylaws and to keep the secrets of the DSE.

I swear to be a model of good behavior to the people, carrier and inspirer of popular unity and reconciliation, and to avoid every deed that reduces or dishonors me, as an individual and as a fighter.

My ideal is a free and strong Democratic Greece, the progress and well-being of the people. And I place my gun and my life in the service of my ideal.

If I ever prove to be a reneger and I violate my oath in bad faith, may the punishing hand of the Fatherland and the hatred and scorn of my people fall upon me mercilessly.”

^{[original text]}

== Notes ==
- The following is the original text, in Greek.

Εγώ, παιδί του Λαού της Ελλάδας και μαχητής του ΔΣΕ, ορκίζομαι: Να πολεμήσω με το όπλο στο χέρι, να χύσω το αίμα μου και να δώσω την ίδια μου τη ζωή, για να διώξω από τα χώματα της πατρίδας μου και τον τελευταίο ξένο καταχτητή. Για να εξαφανίσω κάθε ίχνος φασισμού. Για να εξασφαλίσω και να υπερασπίσω την εθνική ανεξαρτησία και την εδαφική ακεραιότητα της πατρίδας μου. Για να εξασφαλίσω και να υπερασπίσω τη Δημοκρατία, την τιμή, την εργασία, την περιουσία και πρόοδο του λαού μου.

Ορκίζομαι να είμαι καλός, γενναίος και πειθαρχικός στρατιώτης, να εκτελώ όλες τις διαταγές των ανωτέρων μου, να τηρώ όλες τις διατάξεις του κανονισμού και να κρατώ τα μυστικά του ΔΣΕ.

Ορκίζομαι να είμαι υπόδειγμα καλής συμπεριφοράς προς το λαό, φορέας και εμψυχωτής στη λαϊκή ενότητα και συμφιλίωση και να αποφεύγω κάθε πράξη, που θα με εκθέτει και θα με ατιμάζει σαν άτομο και σα μαχητή.

Ιδανικό μου έχω τη λεύθερη και ισχυρή Δημοκρατική Ελλάδα, την πρόοδο και ευημερία του λαού. Και στην υπηρεσία του ιδανικού μου θέτω το όπλο μου και τη ζωή μου.

Αν ποτέ φανώ επίορκος και από κακή πρόθεση παραβώ τον όρκο μου, ας πέσει πάνω μου αμείλικτο το τιμωρό χέρι της Πατρίδας και το μίσος και η καταφρόνια του λαού μου.

== See also ==
- World War II
- Cold War

== Sources ==
- Kamarinos, Aristos (2015). Ο εμφύλιος πόλεμος στη Πελοπόννησο 1946-1949 [The Civil War in the Peloponesse (1946-1949)] (in Greek). Athens: Syghroni Epoxi. ISBN 9789602248720.
- Kyritsis, Nikos (2012). Δημοκρατικός Στρατός Ελλάδας. Ιδρυση - Μονάδες - Αξιωματικοί - Δυνάμεις - Απώλειες - Κοινωνική Σύνθεση [Democratic Army of Greece. Creation – Units – Officers – Strength – Casualties – Social Structure] (in Greek). Athens: Syghroni Epoxi. ISBN 978-960-451-146-4.
