= Civic Guard =

Civic Guard may refer to:

- Garde Civique, Belgium (1830-1920)
- Garda Síochána, Ireland
- Schutterij, Netherlands

== See also ==
- Civil Guard (disambiguation)
