= Executions of Kokkinia =

1944 roundup and massacre in Greece

- The famous engraving of Tassos depicting the Executions of Kokkinia
- Native name: Μπλόκο της Κοκκινιάς
- Location: Nikaia, Attica, Greece (under German occupation)
- Date: 17 August 1944
- Attack type: Roundup, massacre
- Deaths: 315–350
- Victims: 6,000–8,000 hostages, some executed later 1,200 sent to Nazi concentration camps
- Perpetrators: 11th Luftwaffe Field Division, Security Battalions (2,000-2,500 in total)
- Website: Memorial at the execution wall of Kokkinia

The Executions of Kokkinia (Greek: Μπλόκο της Κοκκινιάς) took place on the August 17, 1944, and was the largest Nazi roundup and one of the largest-scale war crimes perpetrated during the German occupation of Greece. The operation was carried out by members of the Luftwaffe and collaborationist Security Battalions, and involved the execution of hundreds of civilians (mostly partisans), thousands of hostages being sent to concentration camps, and the burning down of entire house blocks, as well as significant atrocities. The massacre was partly in retaliation for the Germans' defeat in Battle of Kokkinia five months before, on 4-8 March 1944. The leaders and members of the Security Battalions involved in the killings were never convicted by the Greek state.

== See also ==
- List of massacres in Greece
- The 200 of Kaisariani
