= Eleni Papadaki =

Greek actress

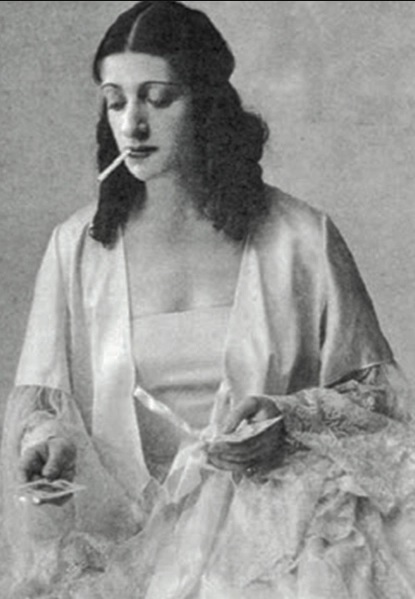
Eleni Papadaki

Eleni Papadaki (Greek: Ελένη Παπαδάκη; 4 November 1903 – 21 December 1944) was a celebrated Greek stage actress who was murdered during the Dekemvriana events, accused for political reasons by the communists, of having collaborated with the Nazi occupation forces and the collaborationist regime during the Axis occupation.

== Biography ==
She was born on 4 November 1903 in Athens to an affluent family, the granddaughter of university professor Stylianos Konstantinidis. She studied philology at Athens University, phonetics, music and piano at the Great Conservatory of Athens, but began an acting career at the age of twenty-two in 1925, in Luigi Pirandello's Six Characters in Search of an Author. The theatre critic for the Demokratia newspaper greeted her performance with the comment that "today the stage has acquired a great actress". At the same time, she also performed in Oscar Wilde's Salome.

Her most successful performances during the last part of her career was in ancient Greek tragedies.

During the Axis occupation of Greece she has been accused of being the mistress of the collaborationist prime minister Ioannis Rallis including right-wing newspapers of the Greek Resistance.

Finally, Eleni Papadaki was executed in Athens on 21 December 1944, during the "Dekemvriana" events, by communists of the OPLA. She had been denounced by a rival actress and after a council of the actors of the National Theatre, who had her expelled for collaboration with the Germans.
