= Meligalas =

Town in Messenia, Greece

Meligalas Μελιγαλάς
- Municipal unit
- Location within the regional unit

- Location within Greece
- Coordinates: 37°13′28″N 21°58′11″E
- Country: Greece
- Administrative region: Peloponnese
- Regional unit: Messenia
- Municipality: Oichalia

Area
  - Municipal unit: 78.2 km^{2} (30.2 sq mi)

Population (2021)
  - Municipal unit: 2,785
  - Municipal unit density: 35.6/km^{2} (92.2/sq mi)
  - Community: 1,228
- Time zone: UTC+2 (EET)
  - Summer (DST): UTC+3 (EEST)
- Vehicle registration: ΚΜ

Meligalas (Greek: Μελιγαλάς) is a town and former municipality in Messenia, Peloponnese, Greece. Since the 2011 local government reform it is part of the municipality Oichalia, of which it is a municipal unit. The municipal unit has an area of 78.193 km^{2}. Population 2,785 (2021).

The town is known for the Battle of Meligalas, which took place on 13–15 September 1944 between the Greek Resistance forces of the Greek People's Liberation Army (ELAS) and the collaborationist Security Battalions. After the battle ELAS forces executed hundreds of Security Battalionists in an event that remains a point of reference and a rallying cry both for the far right and the left in Greece to this day.
