= Security Battalions =

Greek Nazi collaborationist military groups

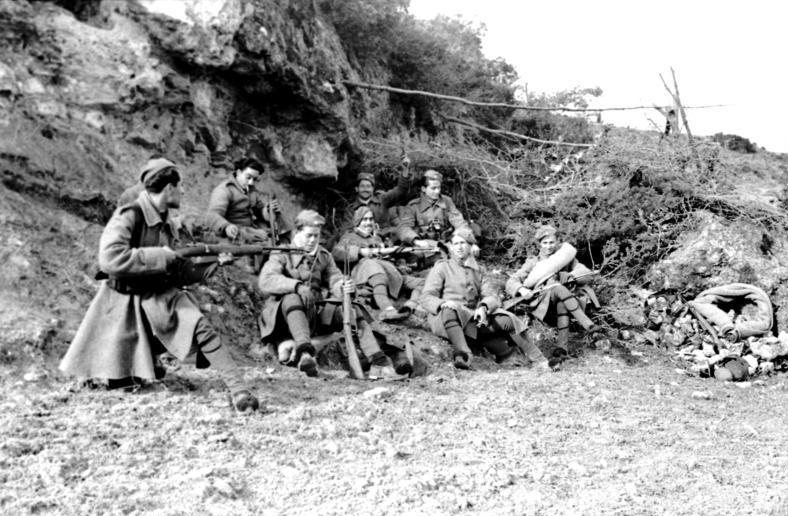
- Men of the Security Battalions resting during an anti-partisan sweep in 1943. They are wearing the service uniform of the pre-war Evzones regiments.
- Leaders: Ioannis Rallis; Ioannis Plytzanopoulos; Vasileios Dertilis; Dionysios Papadongonas
- Dates active: 1943–1944
- Headquarters: Athens
- Ideology: Anti-communism
- Size: at most 22,000 (total)
- Part of: (Hellenic State (1941–1944)) Hellenic State
- Wars: the Axis occupation of Greece

The Security Battalions (Greek: Τάγματα Ασφαλείας, romanized: Tagmata Asfaleias, derisively known as Germanotsoliades (Γερμανοτσολιάδες, meaning "German tsoliás") or Tagmatasfalites (Ταγματασφαλίτες)) were Greek right-wing collaborationist paramilitary groups, formed during the Axis occupation of Greece during World War II in order to support the German occupation troops.

== Founding ==
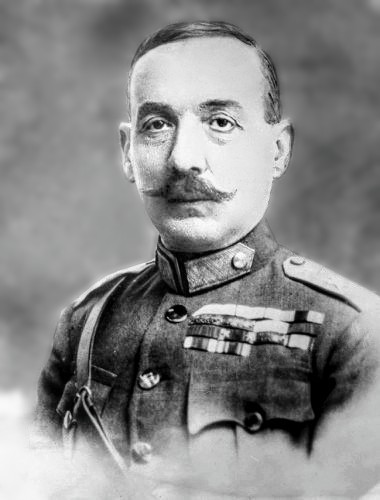
Theodoros Pangalos, the driving force behind the Security Battalions' establishment

The Security Battalions were raised on 7 April 1943 by the collaborationist Greek government of Ioannis Rallis. The driving force behind the Battalions' establishment was the Greek general and statesman Theodoros Pangalos, who saw them as a means of making a political comeback. Pangalos, a fierce republican, was involved in the conflict between royalists and republicans in Greece; most of the Hellenic Army officers recruited into the Security Battalions in April 1943 were republicans associated with Pangalos. Both Pangalos and the clique of republican officers associated with him intended for the Battalions to resist the return of the Greek monarchy, making royalist officers initially reluctant to join. German and Italian authorities viewed Pangalos as unreliable and consequently distrusted the Security Battalions, supplying them only with small arms. Though Pangalos was not formally part of the Battalions, he ensured his followers were given key positions in them.

Support for the Security Battalions' establishment came primarily from the Greek far-right and Nazi sympathisers, along with several centrist politicians concerned by the dominance of ELAS, the military wing of the communist-dominated National Liberation Front (EAM), in the Greek resistance. The Battalions were initially a small force and only began to expand after Italy signed an armistice with the Allies in September 1943. Following the armistice, German forces took control of Italian-occupied Greek territories, while ELAS raided several Italian armouries in Greece. With ELAS better armed and the Germans now occupying more of Greece, the Higher SS and Police Leader Walter Schimana argued that Germany needed an auxiliary force to relieve the burden. As such, German authorities increased the scope and amount of military supplies given to the Security Battalions. ELAS's growth alarmed many conservative Greek officers, including royalists, who flocked to the Security Battalions as a way of defending the "bourgeois world".

== Service and atrocities ==
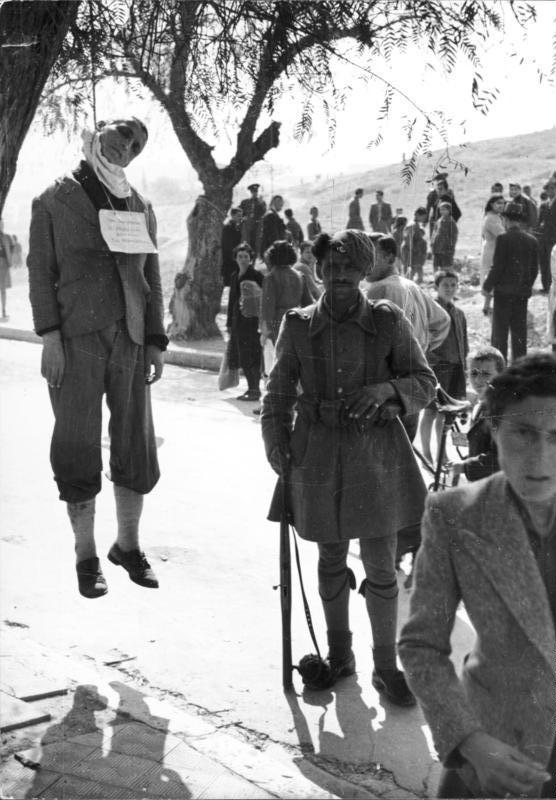
A member of the Security Battalions standing next to an hanged man.

The primary role of the Security Battalions was to participate in counterinsurgency operations against ELAS. Their aggregate force was at most 22,000 men, divided into 9 "evzonic" and 22 "voluntary" battalions under Schimana's overall command. Although the Battalions were intended to be stationed over all of German-occupied Greece, they were primarily concentrated in Eastern Central Greece and the Peloponnese. By late 1943, ELAS had gained control over a third of continental Greece. The Security Battalions remained faithful to the Germans even when the German occupation of Greece was crumbling; their final mission was to fight against ELAS and keep them away from the main routes out of Greece to secure the safe exit of German occupational forces.

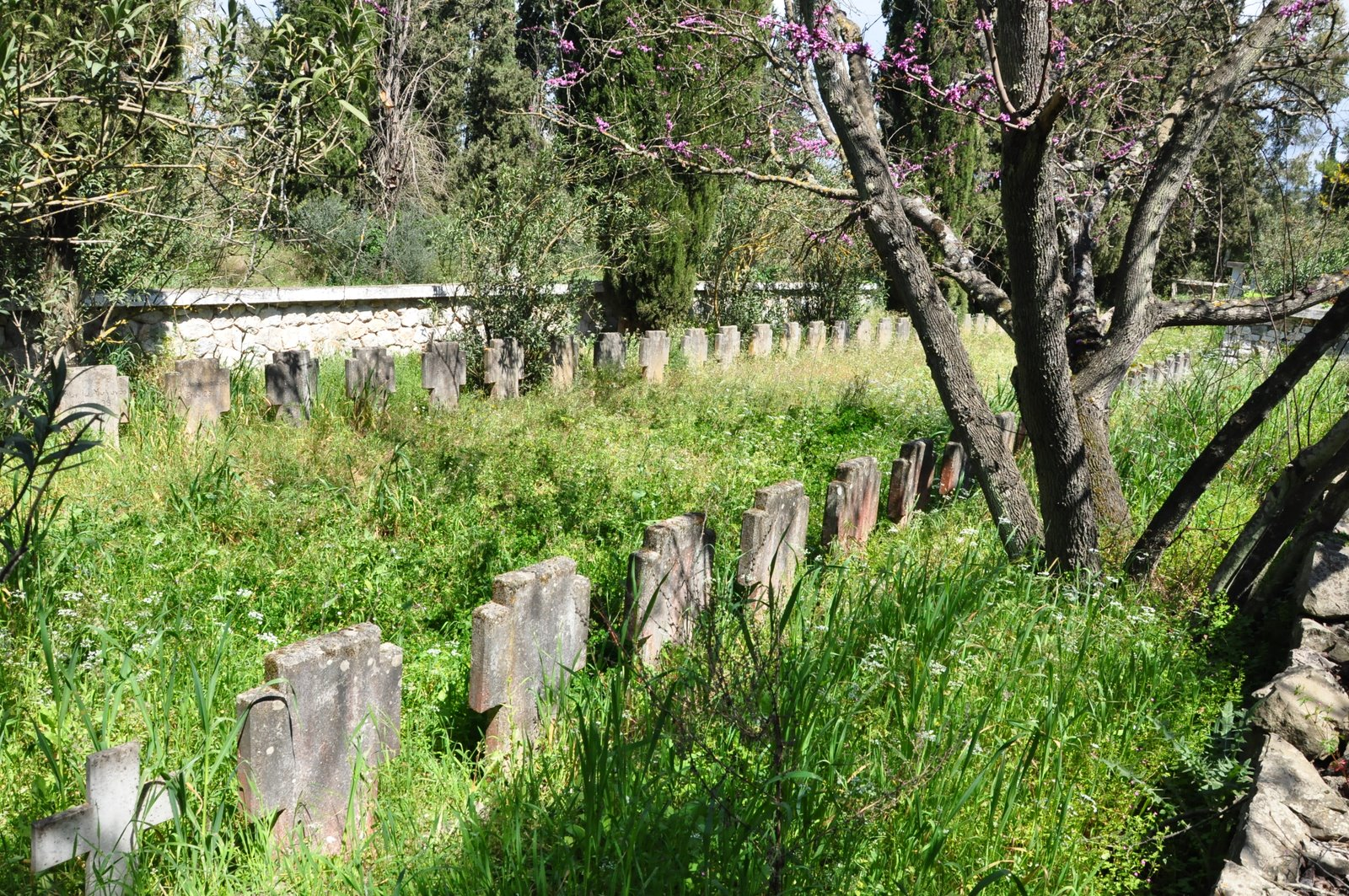
Local cemetery in Meligalas for members of the Security Battalions executed by ELAS

The Security Battalions, whose members were poorly disciplined, soon became notorious in Greece for committing atrocities such as looting, rape and murder. Their conduct was so infamous that even officials of the collaborationist Greek government complained to German occupational authorities that the Battalions were disrupting their efforts to administer areas peacefully and increasing support for the Greek resistance. However, German policy was to encourage the Security Battalions' brutality in an effort to cow Greek resistance to the occupation. As noted by the historian Mark Mazower, the majority of those killed by the Battalions were not resistance members, but instead killed at random as part of indiscriminate counterinsurgency operations.

With Greece's mountainous terrain favouring the resistance and German forces fully committed elsewhere by 1944, the Security Battalions adopted a policy of "total terror", which included both summary executions and targeted killings; one Security Battalion death squad in Volos killed 50 local EAM members over the course of March 1944. In the same month, 100 people were shot at random by the Battalions in retaliation for the assassination of Major-general Franz Krech by ELAS. When members of the Security Battalions were killed by ELAS, the Battalions typically responded by summarily executing anybody in the vicinity. While the resistance usually did not executed captured collaborationist policemen or gendarmes unless they had been involved in the deaths of fellow Greeks, members of the Security Battalions, if captured, were always summarily executed on the grounds that they were all war criminals.

In November 1943, following an invitation of the mayor of Athens on behalf of the Germans, Special Operations Executive officer Major Donald Stott arrived in the city and made contact with the local branch of the Geheime Feldpolizei. Stott subsequently met with senior German officials and requested they arrange for the Security Battalions to switch sides and serve the Greek government-in-exile following the Allied recapture of Greece to prevent EAM from coming to power. Stott was not arrested by the Germans and allowed to return to Cairo. However, Stott's meeting had already been exposed and he was disavowed as a rogue agent and reprimanded while his superior, Brigadier Keble, was fired. Stott's visit inflamed EAM's suspicions towards the government-in-exile as many EAM members believed that once King George II returned to Greece he would pardon the Security Battalions and enlist them to fight on his behalf.

The belief that they were being supported by the Allies and that George II would eventually pardon them further encouraged royalist officers to join the Security Battalions. One of the Battalions' royalist officers, Major-general Vasilios Dertilis, sent an emissary to Cairo in May 1944 which informed the Greek government-in-exile that the Security Battalions were a "patriotic organisation" loyal to George II and committed to the "national struggle" against communism. The Battalions' atrocities were partially motivated by their belief that as both George II and the Western Allies secretly supported them, they would not be punished after the war. An OSS agent reported after interviewing captured Security Battalion members that 35-40% of them believed that the British and American governments secretly supported them. Many of the Greek government-in-exile's leaders secretly approved of the Battalions as a counterweight to EAM, and in June 1944 the government-in-exile successfully requested the BBC's Greek language service to stop referring them as traitors.

In the summer of 1944, the Security Battalions assisted German forces in Athens with blokos (round-ups) ordered by Blume. These involved sealing off one of city's neighbourhoods where EAM was most active while its entire male population was rounded up. Informers wearing hoods would point out suspected EAM members who were summarily executed. Those who were suspected of being EAM sympathisers would be imprisoned as hostages to be executed in response to ELAS attacks against German forces. On the eve of the liberation of Greece, several battles took place between the Battalions and ELAS, including the Battle of Meligalas in September 1944.

== Disbandment and aftermath ==
Following the liberation, the Security Battalions surrendered to Allied forces and were disbanded, with many of their former members being recruited into the Hellenic Gendarmerie to fight alongside British and other Greek government forces against the ELAS during the Dekemvriana in Athens. Only a few veterans of the Battalions were tried and convicted of collaborationism by the Greek government; Rallis, who was sentenced to life imprisonment for treason and died in prison in 1946, was acquitted for his involvement with the Security Battalions. Following the EAM defeat during the Dekemvriana, former Security Battalion members continued to hunt down Greek left-wingers and republicans during the White Terror that followed the Treaty of Varkiza which dismantled ELAS. Many ex-members continued carrying out atrocities against the Democratic Army of Greece during the Greek Civil War; during the civil war, veteran Security Battalions officers formed a secret group known as the Holy Bond of Greek Officers, which from 1947 onward was subsidized by the Central Intelligence Agency as one of Greece's principal anti-communist groups.

Many of the individuals involved with persecuting Greek communists during the 1950s and '60s in Greece, including Greek military personnel stationed on the prison island of Makronisos, were former members of the Security Battalions. The leader of the Greek junta, Georgios Papadopoulos, has also been accused of being a member of the Security Battalions, but without definite proof. One of the first acts of Papadopoulos's government after the 1967 Greek coup d'état which brought it to power was to change the pension rules to allow Security Battalion veterans to collect pensions for their wartime service; veterans who were serving in the Greek military could "top up" their pensions by presenting proof to the pension board of their service in the Battalions. Some members of the Security Battalions were recognized by law during the junta as "resistance fighters against the Axis", but this was cancelled after the junta's fall in 1974.

== Oath ==
Recruits to the Security battalion swore under the following oath:

I swear by God this sacred oath, that I will obey absolutely the orders of the Supreme Commander of the German Army, Adolf Hitler. I will with loyal dedication perform my duties and obey without condition the orders of my superiors. I fully acknowledge that any objection to the obligations hereby accepted will lead to my punishment by the German Military Authorities.

== Members ==
- Xenophon Giosmas after years he took part in the conspiracy for the assassination of Grigoris Lambrakis
- Dionysios Papadongonas was killed later during the Dekemvriana
- Georgios Poulos
- Leonidas Vrettakos

== Sources ==
- Brewer, David (2016). Greece, The Decade of War: Occupation, Resistance, and Civil War. London: I.B. Tauris. ISBN 9781780768540.
- Christodoulou, Nikolaos D. Pro-Axis Security Battalions in Southern Greece, 1943–1944.
- Dordanas, Stratos N. (2005). Έλληνες εναντίον Ελλήνων. Greece: Epikentro. ISBN 978-960-6647-31-4.
- Eudes, Dominique (1973). The Kapetanios. New York: NYU Press. ISBN 085345275X.
- Gluckstein, Donny (2012). A People's History of the Second World War: Resistance Versus Empire. Pluto. ISBN 978-1-84964-719-9.
- Mazower, Mark (1995). Inside Hitler's Greece: The Experience of Occupation, 1941–44. United States: Yale University Press. ISBN 0-300-08923-6.
- Munoz, Antonio J. Herakles & the Swastika: Greek Volunteers in the German Army, Police & SS, 1943–1945.
- Simpson, Christoper (1988). Blowback: America's Recruitment of Nazis and Its Effects on the Cold War. London: Weidenfeld & Nicolson. ISBN 1555841066.
- Stavrogiannopoulos, Vasileios. Η Ζωή της Κατοχής και τα Τάγματα Ασφαλείας.
