= Xenophon Giosmas =

Xenophon Giosmas (Kırkağaç 1906 - January 14, 1975) was a Greek war criminal and Nazi collaborator.

During the Nazi Occupation of Greece between 1941 and 1944, he was the leader of a collaborationist paramilitary force in Pieria and later Thessaloniki. He was sentenced to death in 1945, but in 1952 he was released from prison.

In 1963 he was involved in the assassination of left-wing Member of Parliament Gregoris Lambrakis and was jailed by order of Examining magistrate Christos Sartzetakis, who later became President of Greece.

He died in 1975.
