= Dionysios Papadongonas =

Greek military officer and Nazi collaborator (1888–1944)

Dionysios Papadongonas (Greek: Διονύσιος Παπαδόγγονας/Παπαδόγκωνας; 1888–1944) was a colonel in the Greek Army and a leading collaborationist with Nazi Germany during the Axis occupation of Greece, as an overall commander of the Security Battalions in the Peloponnese.

== Life ==
Dionysios Papadongonas was born in Petalidi, Messenia, in 1888. He became a career infantry officer, and fought in the Balkan Wars of 1912–1913, the Macedonian Front of World War I, and the Asia Minor Campaign, as well as the Allied intervention in Southern Russia during the Russian Civil War. In the late 1930s, he was adjutant to King George II of Greece. During the Greco-Italian War of 1940–1941, he fought with the rank of colonel as a unit commander, then deputy commander, and finally commanding officer of the 5th Infantry Division. He ended the war with the remnants of the division in the Peloponnese, where the unit disbanded in April 1941. He remained in the Peloponnese, settling at Tripoli, before taking on the Kalamata Military Command on behalf of the collaborationist government in mid-1942.

With other royalist officers, Papadongonas tried to create a resistance group called "Hellenic Army" (ES) in 1943, as a counterpart and rival to the leftist EAM-ELAS, which was rapidly emerging as the largest resistance movement in occupied Greece. ES and EAM-ELAS soon began skirmishes, and Papadongonas, ardent anti-communist, he turned to close collaboration with the occupying forces—the Italians first and then, after the Italian Armistice, the Germans—against EAM-ELAS. On 18 August 1943, EAM-ELAS published an agreement supposedly concluded a written agreement between Papadongonas and the Italian commander of the 64th Infantry Regiment, Dorio Domenico, for this purpose. While the authenticity of this document continues to be disputed by historians, Papadongonas himself never explicitly renounced it, and even if doctored, it likely represents his real intentions. German sources also report that Domenico boasted of having intentionally leaked the agreement to EAM-ELAS, to cement the distrust between leftist and royalist resistance groups. Papadongonas was denounced by the rest of ES, which in turn accepted to be integrated into EAM-ELAS under very disadvantageous terms. Some factions within ES, led by Tilemachos Vrettakos, clashed with EAM-ELAS and sided with Papadongonas, seeking weapons from the Germans to unleash a "counter-terror" against the leftists. These did not come in time, and the last ES groups were disbanded by EAM-ELAS in October 1943.

In November 1943, Papadongonas left Kalamata for Athens, but returned to the Peloponnese in March 1944 as head of the Security Battalions' II Gendarmerie Headquarters at Tripoli, thus overall commander of the Security Battalions in the Peloponnese. After learning of Hitler's survival in the 20 July plot, Papadongonas sent congratulations to the German dictator, for which he received a commendation and promises of further support by SS chief Heinrich Himmler, while in his post-war trial, the German commander-in-chief in Greece, Hellmuth Felmy, characterized him as a loyal and honest collaborator of the German forces, who participated actively in the collection and execution of hostages as reprisals for attacks on German troops.

Papadongonas was killed on 7 December 1944 at Goudi, during the Dekemvriana in Athens. He was posthumously promoted to the rank of major general by the royalist government, but this was cancelled on 22 August 1945 due to his role in the Security Battalions.

== Sources ==
- Dreidoppel, Kaspar (2009). Der griechische Dämon: Widerstand und Bürgerkrieg im besetzten Griechenland 1941-1944 [The Greek Demon: Resistance and Civil War in Occupied Greece 1941–1944] (in German). Wiesbaden: Otto Harrassowitz. ISBN 978-3-44705929-9.
- Fleischer, Hagen (2020). Krieg und Nachkrieg: Das schwierige deutsch-griechische Jahrhundert [War and Post-War: The Difficult German–Greek Century] (in German). Cologne: Vandenhoeck & Ruprecht. ISBN 978-341251790-8.
- Haralambidis, Menelaos (2023). Οι Δωσίλογοι: Ένοπλη, πολιτική και οικονομική συνεργασία στα χρόνια της Κατοχής [The Collaborators: Armed, Political and Economic Collaboration During the Occupation] (in Greek). Athens: Alexandreia. ISBN 978-618-223-034-3.
- Hondros, John Louis (1983). Occupation and Resistance: The Greek Agony, 1941-44. Englewood Cliffs, NJ: Pella Publishing Company. ISBN 978-0-918618-19-1.
- Priovolos, Giannis (2018). Εθνικιστική «αντίδραση» και Τάγματα Ασφαλείας [Nationalist "Reaction" and the Security Battalions] (in Greek). Athens: Patakis. ISBN 978-960-16-7561-9.
- Μεγάλη Στρατιωτικὴ καὶ Ναυτικὴ Ἐγκυκλοπαιδεία. Tόμος Πέμπτος: Νάβα–Σαρακηνοί [Great Military and Naval Encyclopaedia. Volume V: Nave–Saracens] (in Greek). Athens: Ἔκδοσις Μεγάλης Στρατιωτικῆς καὶ Ναυτικῆς Ἐγκυκλοπαιδείας. 1930. p. 476. OCLC 31255024.
