= National Civil Guard =

World War II era security force under PEEA

The National Civil Guard (Greek: Εθνική Πολιτοφυλακή, Ethniki Politophylaki) was the security force of the Political Committee of National Liberation (PEEA), the government that the National Liberation Front (EAM) had established in the territory it controlled during the Nazi occupation of Greece in 1944. It was the successor of the EAM'S Organization for the Protection of the People's Struggle (OPLA).

The military commander of the National Civil Guard was Panagiotis Nasis, a former Greek Army major general who had decided to join EAM during the occupation, while Vasos Georgiou, a communist journalist, was appointed as political commissar of the force.

The National Civil Guard was abolished in February 1945 following the Varkiza Agreement.
