= Hellenic Gendarmerie =

Former Greek gendarmerie and military police force

Hellenic Gendarmerie Ελληνική Χωροφυλακή
- Emblem of Hellenic Gendarmerie, 1969–1984

- War flag of the Hellenic Gendarmerie, 1951–1984

Agency overview
- Formed: 1833
- Dissolved: 1984
- Superseding agency: Hellenic Police

Jurisdictional structure
- Operations jurisdiction: Greece
- General nature: Gendarmerie

Operational structure
- Parent agency: Ministry of Public Order

Notables
- Person: Colonel François Graillard (first)
- Anniversaries: St Irene's feast day (Annually, 5 May); Commemoration of the fallen in the Battle of Athens (Annually, 6 December)

The Hellenic Gendarmerie (Greek: Ελληνική Χωροφυλακή, Elliniki Chorofylaki) was the national gendarmerie and military police (until 1951) force of Greece.

== History ==
=== 19th century ===
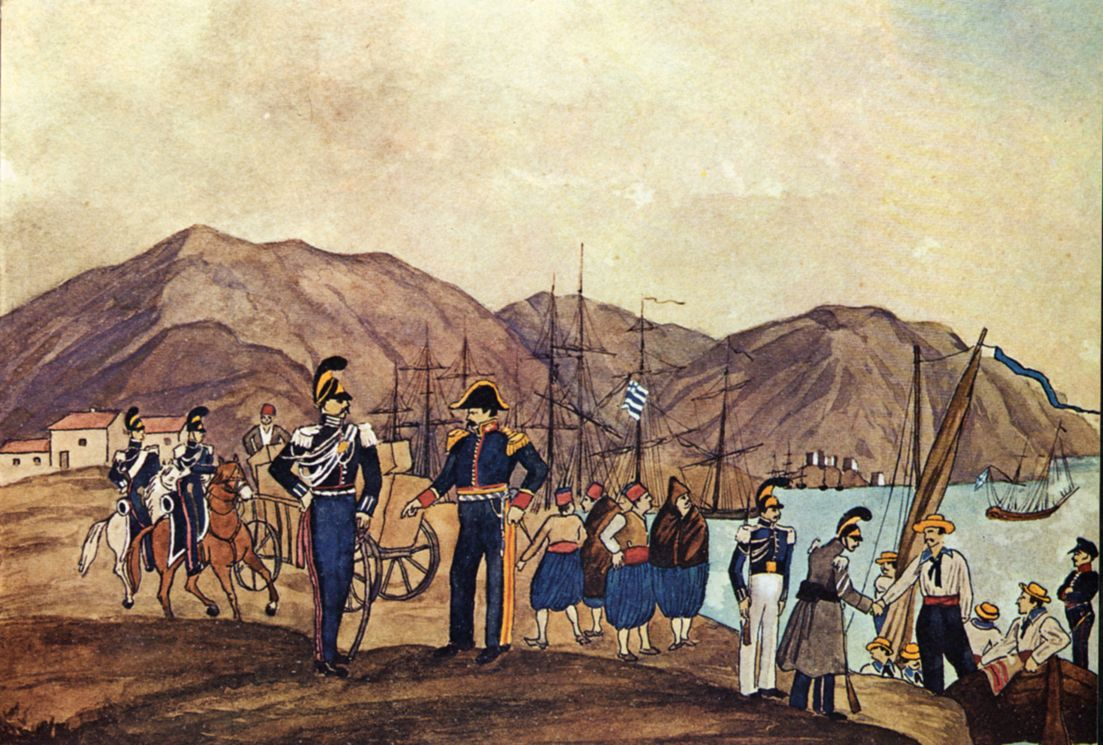
Gendarmes in Chalcis in 1835.

The Greek Gendarmerie was established after the enthronement of King Otto in 1833 as the Royal Gendarmerie (Greek: Βασιλική Χωροφυλακή) and modeled after the French National Gendarmerie. It was at that time formally part of the army and under the authority of the Army Ministry. Several foreign advisers (particularly from Bavaria, who emphasized elements of centralization and authoritarianism), were also brought in to provide training and tactical advice to the newly formed force. The main task of the Gendarmerie under the army as a whole during this period was firstly to combat the extensive banditry which was endemic in the countryside throughout the 19th century and included kidnappings for ransom, the suppression of local revolts, and the establishment of a strong executive government. Dimitrios Deligeorgis was appointed commander in 1854.

The army's links to the Gendarmerie and the nature of the structure of the force and its hierarchy (that of being similar to the army) was maintained throughout the 19th century for a number of reasons, primarily the socio-political unrest that characterized the period including disproportionate poverty, governmental oppression, sporadic rebellions and political instability. As a result of this, as well as the input of the armed forces, the Gendarmerie remained a largely conservative body throughout the period, there was also a certain amount of politicization during training as the Gendarmerie were trained in military camps.

=== 20th century ===
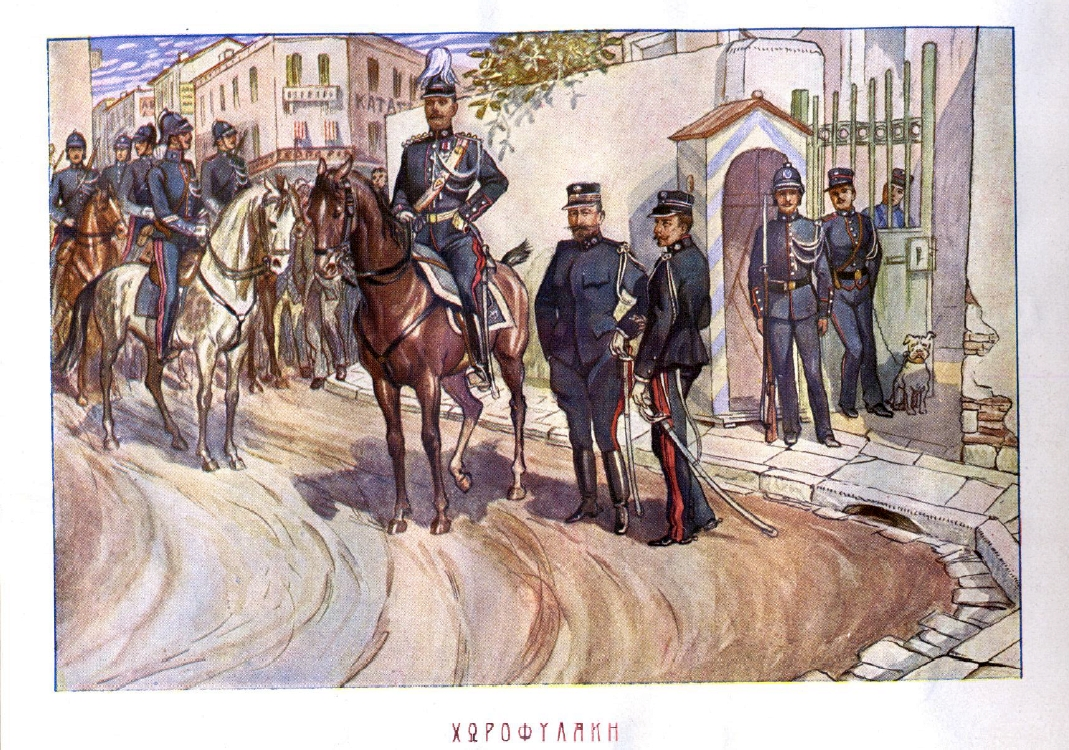
Greek Gendarmerie at the turn of the 20th century

In 1906 the Gendarmerie underwent its first major restructuring at an administrative level. It acquired its own educational and training facilities independent of those of the army (though still remaining a nominal part of the armed forces). Despite this, the Gendarmerie still maintained a largely military based structure, based on its involvement in the Macedonian Struggle, and the Balkan and First World Wars. As a result, it tended to neglect civilian matters, something addressed with the establishment of a civilian city police force for Attica in 1920, which would eventually be expanded to urban centers in the entire country.

Modernization of the country's police forces was stunted by the successive periods of political instability, which culminated in the regime of Ioannis Metaxas and the Second World War. After the war, however, British experts were brought in to help reform the police along the lines of the British Police. As a result, after 1946 the police forces ceased to be a formal part of the Defence Ministry, although they retained several military features and were organized along military lines.

Reflecting a new emphasis on civilian policing, in 1984 both the Gendarmerie and the Cities Police were merged into a single unified Hellenic Police. Although elements of the former military structure and hierarchy were maintained, explicit characteristics of a "militarily organized" force (such as courts-martial) were lost.

== Ranks insignia ==
=== 1908–1935 ===
Ranks
Moirarchos	Ypomoirarchos	Anthypomoirarchos	Enomotarchis A'	Enomotarchis Β'	Ypenomotarchis

=== 1935–1970 ===
Ranks
Lieutenant General (Chief) Αντιστράτηγος	Major General (Υποστράτηγος)	Brigadier Ταξίαρχος (1946 onwards)	Colonel (Police director) Συνταγματάρχης	Lieutenant Colonel Αν/χης	Major (Ταγματάρχης)	Commander Μοίραρχος	Lieutenant Υπομοίραρχος	Second Lieutenant Ανθυπομοίραρχος	Warrant Officer Ανθυπασπιστής	Gendarme Master Sergeant Ενωμοτάρχης Α΄	Gendarme Staff Sergeant Ενωμοτάρχης	Gendarme Sergeant Υπενωμοτάρχης	Gendarme Χωροφύλακας	Gendarme Operative Δόκιμος Χωροφύλακας

=== 1975–1984 ===
Ranks
General (ret.) Στρατηγός (ε.α.)	Lieutenant General (Chief) Αντιστράτηγος	Major General (Υποστράτηγος)	Brigadier Ταξίαρχος	Colonel (Police director) Συνταγματάρχης	Lieutenant Colonel Αν/χης	Major (Ταγματάρχης)	Commander Μοίραρχος	Lieutenant Υπομοίραρχος	Second Lieutenant Ανθυπομοίραρχος	Warrant Officer Ανθυπασπιστής	Ενωμοτάρχης Α΄	Ενωμοτάρχης	Υπενωμοτάρχης	Gendarme Χωροφύλακας	Gendarme in Training Δόκιμος Χωροφύλακας

== Equipment ==
=== Small arms ===
Name	Country of origin	Type	Notes	Image
Smith and Wesson № 38	United States	Revolver	Length: 26 cm Weight: 801 gr	
№ 36 grenade	United Kingdom	Hand grenade		
MK3A1 grenade	United States	Hand grenade		
CN M7 tear gas grenade	United States	Hand grenade		
CN DM irritant grenade	United States	Hand grenade		
AN-M14 incendiary grenade	United States	Hand grenade		
CH (M8) smoke grenade	United States	Hand grenade		
M15 white phosphorus smoke grenade	United States	Hand grenade		
M18 colored smoke flare	United States	Hand grenade		
AN-M3 red smoke flare	United States	Hand grenade		
Lee–Enfield	United Kingdom (№ 1,3,4) Canada (№4)	Bolt action rifle		
M1 Garand	United States	Semi-automatic rifle		
Thompson	United States	Submachine gun		
Bren gun	United Kingdom	Light machine gun		
60mm M19 mortar	United States	Mortar		
