= Glossary of the Greek military junta =

Glossary of terms used by the (1967- 1974) military junta of Greece

The ideology of the military junta that ruled Greece from 1967 to 1974 was followed by the creation and/or use of special terms that were employed by the junta as propaganda tools and to transmit its message to the Greek people as well as influence their way of thinking and attack the anti-junta movement. The terms of the lexicon include unique expressions and institutions that provide a glimpse into junta's mindset and government structure. Other words and concepts were borrowed and appropriated. Yet other terms were already in use prior to the 1967 coup. Finally, some are taken from Greece's cultural tradition. Some examples of these terms as well as their contextual meaning follow.

Term/phrase/slogan/euphemism Transliteration	Translation and context
Anarchikos (Αναρχικός)	Anarchist (the junta bent the dictionary definition of the term to mean any opponent of only their archi (αρχή) meaning, exclusively, any opponent of their junta government)
Anarchokommounistes (Αναρχοκομμουνιστές)	Anarchists-Communists (specially designed to indicate no political difference between anarchists and communists)
Neolaia Alkimon (Νεολαία Αλκίμων)	Alkimos, (Greek: strong, sturdy, robust i.e. Youth of the Strong, (word originally used in a Spartan exchange between adult mentors and Spartan youth)), also known as Papadopoulos' Youth. Organised youth movement, open to both sexes, modelled after the scouts with nationalist overtones. Alkimoi were dressed in all black cadet style uniforms with matching black cap. Participation was entirely voluntary with no coercion or social stigma attached for not participating. Disbanded after Papadopoulos' fall from power.
Ethnikofron (Εθνικόφρων)	To think of the Nation or Nation-minded. The junta and, more broadly, the post-civil war Greek Right conflated the term ethnikofron with that of patriot given that in their visualization of politics only right-wingers and junta supporters could be inspired by patriotism.
Antethnikos (Αντεθνικός) lit. Anti-Nation, also Anthellinikos (Ανθελληνικός) meaning anti-Hellenic, anti-Greek	The opposite of Ethnikofron. It means against the nation (adjective). Describes anyone declared to be or who has acted against the junta. The term usually, but not exclusively, was reserved for those out of junta's reach (i.e. out of the country) as, for example, in antethniki propaganda i.e. propaganda (from abroad) against the junta, or distinguished and well known personalities that could not be labelled otherwise. For lesser personalities and domestic resistance, especially students, Anarchokommounistes was, more often, the label of choice.
Antethniki drastiriotis (Αντεθνική δραστηριότης)	Activity against the Nation indicating resistance action against the junta. Distinguished Greeks such as Mikis Theodorakis, Melina Mercouri, Andreas Papandreou and many others were thus accused.
Fakellos (Φάκελλος)	File. The junta kept files containing records pertaining to hundreds of thousands of Greek citizens who were suspected by deed or association of opposing the regime. Files were kept not only for individuals who had expressed disapproval or criticism of the regime, or who had engaged in acts of protest or resistance but also for those who fraternized with such individuals or had family associations with them.
Ellas Ellinon Christianon (Ελλάς Ελλήνων Χριστιανών)	Greece of the Christian Greeks. This was the junta's main ideological slogan. Old nationalist slogan appropriated by the junta for its political ends.
Patris Thriskia Oikogeneia (Πατρίς, Θρησκεία, Οικογένεια)	Fatherland, Religion, Family. This was the second of the junta's main slogans. Traditional slogan appropriated by the junta.
Synodiporia (Συνοδοιπορεία)	(Umbrella term) Literally: The ones walking the street together (fellow travellers) initially meaning the leftist sympathisers and in general all democratic opponents of the junta, (term reserved for domestic opponents).
Diethnis Synodiporia (Διεθνής Συνοδοιπορεία)	International Synodiporia (International fellow travellers) meaning the international supporters of the domestic leftist sympathisers and their allies.
Palaiokommatistes (Παλαιοκομματιστές)	Old party system men (the democratic politicians and de facto opposition that the junta removed from power)
I Epanastasis (Η Επανάστασις)	The Revolution meaning the Junta Dictatorship
I Ethnosotirios Epanastasis (Η Εθνοσωτήριος Επανάστασις)	The nation-saving Revolution meaning The Junta Dictatorship that saved Greece
Otan ego apofasiso tha ginoun ekloges ('Οταν εγώ αποφασίσω θα γίνουν εκλογές)	When I decide there will be elections (in Greece): Papadopoulos' announcement to the Greek press in 1969. Front-page news on Vradyni and other newspapers. Indicated substantial political engineering mission creep from the collective Ethnosotirios epanastasis by the armed forces to one man rule by Papadopoulos. Illustrates Papadopoulos' rising power within the collective as well as the absence of any real democratic ethos on his part.
Asthenis ston gypso (Ασθενής στο γύψο)	Patient in a cast meaning Greece (An allegory frequently employed by George Papadopoulos in his speeches to imply that his regime was tantamount to a doctor trying to fix Greece's ailment)
Rahokokalia tou laou (Ραχοκοκαλιά του λαού)	(Demotic Greek) The backbone of the people meaning the farmers
Skotadismos (Σκοταδισμός)	Literally The Darkness-ism (political movement), meaning the Western liberal opponents of the junta and, in general, the West's political and to a much lesser extent cultural (especially hippie) influence on Greek life
Isichia, Taxis kai Asfalia (Ησυχία Τάξις και Ασφάλεια)	Calm, Order and Security indicating no overt reaction against the junta
Epikratoun kath' olin tin epikrateian (Επικρατούν καθ' όλην την Επικράτειαν)	Predominate throughout the (Greek) domain usually following Isichia, Taxis kai Asfalia above
Apofasizomen kai thiatassomen (Αποφασίζομεν και διατάσσομεν)	We decide and we order typical preamble of all junta legislative announcements (usually announced on the radio and especially frequent after coup or counter coup). This phrase did not leave too much doubt as to who was in charge in Greece at the time and what type of decision making process they employed.
I Kentriki Simvouleftiki Epitropi (Η Κεντρική Συμβουλευτική Επιτροπή)	The Central Advisory Council (Committee) otherwise known as Papadopoulos' (pseudo) Parliament. Composed of members elected through an electoral type process but limited to ethnikofrones only, it met in Athens in the Parliament Building and its purpose was to "advise" the dictator. It was formed in 1970 and was dissolved just prior to Papadopoulos' failed attempt to liberalise his regime with Markezinis.
I Periferiaki Simvouleftiki Epitropi (Η Περιφερειακή Συμβουλευτική Επιτροπή)	The Peripheral (Provincial) Advisory Council (Committee). Its members were elected through the same electoral process as above and its purpose was to "advise" the dictator on provincial matters. Its meetings were held in provincial centres such as Ioannina normally once a week. It was dissolved at the same time as Kentriki Simvouleftiki Epitropi.
Eidikon Anakritikon Tmima - Elliniki Stratiotiki Astinomia (EAT - ESA) (Ειδικόν Ανακριτικόν Τμήμα - Ελληνική Στρατιωτική Αστυνομία (EAT - ΕΣΑ))	Special Interrogation Section (Greek Military Police). This term is a euphemism. In practice it indicated interrogation with torture or more simply a torture chamber. ESA was most active during the Ioannides junta.
I Ellas ine ena ergotaxion (Η Ελλάς είναι ένα Εργοτάξιον)	Greece is a construction zone (designed to highlight junta's success on the economic front. Included Ioannis Ladas' hotels on the rocks). Associated propaganda films usually featured a smiling Stylianos Pattakos with a trowel at hand and an engineer's hard hat setting the foundation stone of some structure. In fact the Greek people nicknamed Pattakos to proto mystri tis Elladas translated as the first trowel of Greece.
Hippy (Χίππυ)	Hippie, any young male with long hair during the junta years. In junta's sociological order the hippy was the opposite of alkimos youth. Strict directives were issued and followed in most high schools during the junta years forbidding long hair for male students. Non complying students faced expulsion from school.
To Pistevo Mas (Το Πιστεύω Mας)	Our Credo, a series of volumes with the speeches, writings and ideological ramblings of Papadopoulos, published and distributed during the period. This practice mirrored the habit of several contemporaneous dictators, including Mao Zedong. Displaying a volume of To Pistevo Mas on one's desk was sine qua non for every ambitious civil servant at the time.
O dromos ton opoion ofeilomen na dianysomen einai makrys kai tha parameinei epiponos, to telos tou, omos, katohyronei ena lambron mellon thia tin patrida mas. (Ο δρόμος τον οποίον οφείλομεν να διανύσωμεν είναι μακρύς και θα παραμείνει επίπονος, το τέλος του, ομως, κατοχυρώνει ένα λαμπρόν μέλλον δια την πατρίδαν μας)	The road that we ought to travel is long and will remain painstaking, its final destination, however, ensures a bright future for our Fatherland. (Excerpt of one of Papadopoulos' speeches published as a poster and distributed to high schools during the junta years)
Nea Ellada (Νέα Ελλάδα)	New Greece i.e. Greece at the end of the (junta) road i.e. at the end of a successful dictatorship course.

Sometimes the terms were combined for stronger effect. As an example O Skotadismos kai i Synodiporia meaning Western and Greek leftist sympathisers, in other words internal and external opposition to the junta.

The junta always communicated in katharevousa Greek with only one exception, Rahokokalia tou laou, which was specially coined for farmer consumption and it is the only phrase in the junta vocabulary to be in demotic Greek.

== See also ==
- Lingua Tertii Imperii
- Newspeak
