= Alexandros Hatzipetros =

Greek soldier and politician

- Αλέξανδρος Χατζηπέτρος

Deputy Minister for Foreign Affairs
- In office 31 July 1972 – 8 October 1973

Chief of the Central Intelligence Service
- In office 24 April 1967 – 3 June 1972
- Preceded by: Kyriakos Papageorgopoulos
- Succeeded by: Michael Roufogalis

Personal details
- Born: 1907 Corinth, Greece
- Died: 2006 (aged 98–99) Greece

Military service
- Allegiance: Greece
- Branch/service: Hellenic Army
- Rank: Colonel

Alexandros Hatzipetros (Greek: Αλέξανδρος Χατζηπέτρος, 1907–2006) was a Greek military officer who served as Chief of the Central Intelligence Service and Deputy Minister for Foreign Affairs during the Regime of the Colonels.

Hatzipetros, a career soldier, was a descendant of freedom-fighter Christodoulos Hatzipetros. He was a Colonel in the Artillery when the coup d'état of 1967 which installed the Junta took place. In the wake of the coup, Hatzipetros was appointed Chief of the Central Intelligence Service, a post he held until June 1972. The following month, he assumed the position of Deputy Foreign Minister and remained in that position until the fall of the Junta in late 1973. He was tried and acquitted in the Greek Junta Trials. Hatzipetros died in 2006.
