= Michael Roufogalis =

Greek Army officer

Lieutenant General Michael S. Roufogalis
- Μιχαήλ Σ. Ρουφογάλης

Chief of the Central Intelligence Service
- In office 3 June 1972 – 28 November 1973
- Preceded by: Alexandros Hatzipetros
- Succeeded by: Lambros Stathopoulos

Personal details
- Born: 1921 Akrata, Kingdom of Greece
- Died: 24 February 2000 (aged 78–79) Athens, Greece
- Spouse: Della Roufogalis

Military service
- Allegiance: Greece
- Branch/service: Hellenic Army
- Rank: Lieutenant General

Michael S. Roufogalis (Greek: Μιχαήλ Σ. Ρουφογάλης), commonly Michalis Roufogalis (Μιχάλης Ρουφογάλης, 1921 – 24 February 2000) was a Greek Army officer and leading member of the Greek military junta of 1967-1974. He was born in Akrata and grew up in Patras.

Originally an officer in the Greek Army's Artillery, under the junta he was appointed chief of the Greek Central Intelligence Service (KYP).

In 1968, he and his agency secretly funded the presidential campaign of Richard Nixon.

After the restoration of democracy in 1974, he was arrested, tried and convicted during the Greek Junta Trials. He was released from prison on health grounds in 1992, and died in 2000. His wife, Della Roufogalis, was a famous Greek fashion model.
