= Nikolaos Stapas =

Greek Air Force officer

Portrait photo of Nikolaos Stapas as Air Marshal

Air Chief Marshal Nikolaos Stapas (Greek: Νικόλαος Στάπας, 1937 – 14 June 2011) was a Greek Air Force officer and Chief of the Hellenic Air Force General Staff.

He was born in 1937 in the village of Sykea in Laconia. He entered the Hellenic Air Force Academy and graduated in 1958. During the Greek military junta of 1967–1974, Stapas became involved in the abortive Navy attempt to rebel against the regime in May 1973. He was imprisoned and tortured by the Greek Military Police, before being dismissed from service. In 1975, after the fall of the junta, he was reinstated. He served in several command and staff posts: CO of the 340th Fighter-Bomber Squadron and the 115th Fighter Wing, Chief of the Tactical Air Force Command, and finally, from 23 December 1986 until his resignation on 15 July 1989 as Chief of the Air Force General Staff. He retired with the rank of Air Chief Marshal.

== Sources ==
- Απεβίωσε ο επίτιμος Αρχηγός ΓΕΑ πτέραρχος Νίκος Στάπας. Eleftherotypia (in Greek). 14 June 2011.
- Former Chiefs of Staff at the official website of the Hellenic Air Force

Military offices
Preceded by Dimitrios Apostolakis	Chief of the Hellenic Air Force General Staff; 23 December 1986 – 15 July 1989	Succeeded by Georgios Mavrakis
