= Spyros Moustaklis =

- Born: Σπυρίδων Μουστακλής; 1926; Missolonghi
- Died: April 28, 1986 (aged 59–60) Athens
- Branch: Hellenic Army
- Rank: Lieutenant General
- Conflicts: World War II; Greek Civil War; Korean War
- Children: 1

Lieutenant General Spyros Moustaklis (Greek: Σπύρος Μουστακλής; Missolonghi, 1926 – 1986) was an officer of the Greek Army. During the military junta years in Greece, he actively opposed the dictatorship and suffered permanent damage as the result of torture, making him a symbol of the anti-junta resistance.

Prosecutor: They beat you?

Moustaklis: Pat . . Pat . . Pat.

Prosecutor: On the throat?

Moustaklis: Yes, yes.

Prosecutor: That's enough. We'll stop the questioning. I think it's enough.

From the transcript of the first trial of the ESA torturers.

Moustaklis became a member of EDES on 2 April 1943, aged 17, following a confrontation with ELAS members which sent him to the hospital. Moustaklis fought with EDES against the Wehrmacht, the Royal Italian Army and ELAS. He was wounded in action during the Battle of Profitis Ilias in Arta (21/12/1944), suffering a comminutive fibula fracture and hospitalized in the 5th Polish General Hospital in Casamassima, near Bari, Italy.

Following the end of the war, Moustaklis, alongside other ex-EDES members, was enrolled in the Hellenic Military Academy. He graduated in 1948. He subsequently took part in the last phase of the Greek Civil War (1948-1949) as an Anthypolochagos and the Korean War (30/4/1952 - 14/7/1953) as an Ypolochagos.

Moustaklis was one of the few Army officers that took part in the attempted Navy revolt in 1973 against the Papadopoulos junta. After the revolt was betrayed and suppressed, he was arrested and tortured by the Greek Military Police in the torture chambers of EAT/ESA. He was arrested on 22 May 1973 and stayed at the EAT/ESA torture centre for 47 days, but despite the efforts of his interrogators, he did not betray his colleagues. During a torture session he suffered brain trauma after a violent blow to his carotid artery and was subsequently rushed to hospital in a vegetative state. His life was saved, but he was left paralyzed for the rest of his life. Only with months of physiotherapy was he able to regain limited movement.

After the fall of the junta he became close friends with another resistance hero, Alexandros Panagoulis. The brain damage he sustained proved to be permanent and he never regained his ability to speak. His emotional state froze permanently to the state he was in during his torture and he was known to curse his torturers and reenact the traumatic experiences of his captivity for the rest of his life. Despite that, years after the restoration of democracy, when asked during a documentary if he broke during interrogation, he was able to move his hands, in an animated fashion, to indicate that he did not.

Posthumously, the Greek State dedicated a memorial to him as recognition of his contribution to the struggle for democracy in Greece. He was awarded the honorary rank of Lieutenant General, and his name was given to the military camp housing the Recruit Training Centre of his home town of Missolonghi.

== Orders and decorations ==
Greece

- Order of the Phoenix
- War Cross
- Medal for Excellent Actions (Μετάλλιο Εξόχων Πράξεων)
- Medal of Military Merit
- National Resistance 1941-1945 Commemorative Medal

United Nations

- United Nations Korea Medal

== See also ==
- Michalis Vardanis
