= Kastri =

Kastri (Greek: Καστρί) may refer to several places in Greece:

- Kastri, Arcadia, a village in the municipality North Kynouria, Arcadia
- Kastri, Attica, a city quarter in Nea Erythraia in Athens
- Kastri, Crete, a village in the Chania regional unit
- Kastri, Evrymenes, a village in the Ioannina regional unit
- Kastri, Gavdos is the capital of the island of Gavdos in the Chania regional unit
- Kastri, Cythera, an ancient settlement on the island of Cythera
- Kastri, Larissa, a village in the municipal unit Lakereia, Larissa regional unit
- Kastri, Phocis, a medieval village on the site of Delphi
- Kastri, Preveza, a village in the municipal unit Fanari, Preveza regional unit
- Kastri (Syros), a prehistoric settlement on the island of Syros, Syros-Ermoupoli regional unit; see Syros#Kastri culture
- Kastri, Thesprotia, a village in Thesprotia
- Kastro, Thasos, also known as Kastri
