= K. C. Malick =

Khirod Chanrad Malick
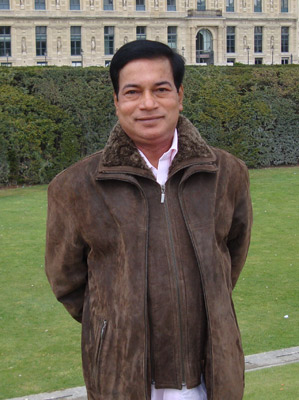
- Khirod Chandra Malick, Paris Meeting

Personal details
- Profession: Social Worker, Banker

Khirod Chandra Malick (born 26 April 1958) is the founder of an NGO Bharat Integrated Social Welfare Agency (BISWA). As of 2012 he was chairman of the group since its foundation in 1994 and is involved in the process of grassroots social engineering. Before starting the NGO, Malick worked at State Bank of India for 26 years, leaving as a senior executive.
