= Anthem of the 21st of April =

Ο Ύμνος της 21ης Απριλίου
English: Anthem of the 21st of April
- Unofficial anthem of the Regime of the Colonels
- Lyrics: George Oikonomidis, 1967
- Music: George Katsaros, 1967
- Adopted: 1967
- Relinquished: 1974

Audio sample
- Anthem of the 21st of April: file; help

The Anthem of the 21st of April (Greek: Ύμνος της 21ης Απριλίου) was the anthem of the ruling military regime during the Greek military junta of 1967–74, de facto used as an unofficial co-national anthem along with the Hymn to Liberty. The anthem glorifies the "national revolution" begun by the regime, which took power with the Coup d'état of 21 April 1967.

== Lyrics ==
Greek original

Μέσα στ' Απρίλη τη Γιορτή
το Μέλλον χτίζει η Νιότη
αγκαλιασμένη - δυνατή
μ' Εργάτη, Αγρότη, Φοιτητή
και πρώτο τον Στρατιώτη.

Τραγούδι αγάπης αντηχεί
γελούν όλα τα χείλη
Και σμίγουν μέσα στην ψυχή
του Εικοσι-ένα η εποχή
κι η Εικοσι-μιά τ' Απρίλη

Μες στις καρδιές φτάνει ζεστή
του Απριλιού η λιακάδα
κι έχουν στα στήθεια μας χτιστεί
Θρησκεία, Οικογένεια
και πάνω απ' όλα Ελλάδα!

Romanization of Greek

Mésa st' Apríli ti Giortí
to Méllon chtízei hi Nióti
angaliasméni – dynatí
m' Ergáti, Agróti, phoitití
cai próto ton Stratióti.

Tragoúdi agápis anticheí
geloún hóla ta cheíli
Cai smígoun mésa stin psychí
tou Eicosi-héna hi epochí
ci hi Eicosi-miá t' Apríli

Mes stis cardiés phtánei zestí
tou Aprilioú hi liacáda
ci échoun sta stítheia mas chtisteí
Thrisceía, Oicogéneia
cai páno ap' hóla Helláda!

English translation

In the feast of April
The Youth builds the future
embraced - strong
with the Worker, Farmer, Student
and first of all the Soldier.

A song of love sounds
all lips smile
And unite inside the soul
the era of '21
and the 21st of April

Inside the hearts arrives warm
the sunshine of April
and they are built on our chests
Religion, Family
and above all Greece!

== See also ==
- Horst-Wessel-Lied
- Cara al Sol
- Maréchal, nous voilà !
- Giovinezza
