= Greek junta trials =

Court trials following the Greek military junta

The junta on trial. Ioannidis standing up while Papadopoulos, Makarezos and Pattakos watch the proceedings from the front row

The Greek junta trials (Greek: Οι Δίκες της Χούντας translated as: The Τrials of the Junta) were the court trials involving members of the military junta that ruled Greece from 21 April 1967 to 23 July 1974. These trials involved the instigators of the 21 April coup d'état, as well as other junta members of various ranks who took part in the events of the Athens Polytechnic uprising and in the torture of citizens.

The military coup leaders were formally arrested during the metapolitefsi period that followed the junta, and in early August 1975 the government of Konstantinos Karamanlis brought charges of high treason and insurrection against Georgios Papadopoulos and other co-conspirators. The mass trial, described as "Greece's Nuremberg" and known as "The Trial of the Instigators", took place at the Korydallos Prison amidst heavy security.

The principal leaders of the 1967 coup, Georgios Papadopoulos, Stylianos Pattakos and Nikolaos Makarezos, were sentenced to death for high treason, following the trial. Shortly after the sentences were pronounced, they were commuted to life imprisonment by the Karamanlis government.

The trial of the instigators was followed by a second trial which investigated the events surrounding the Athens Polytechnic uprising known as "The Trial of the Polytechnic" and, finally, a series of trials involving incidents of torture known in Greece as "The Trials of the Torturers".

Journalist and author Leslie Finer, who was expelled by the junta from Greece in 1968, reporting in 1975 on the trials for New Society wrote: "The trial of 20 ringleaders of the 1967 coup is a test of democratic justice. Among its other functions, this is a mode of exorcism and education." The 1974 invasion of Cyprus was the final straw which led to the military withdrawing its support for the junta and for any military men acting as politicians.

== Historical background ==
After the fall of the junta in July 1974, as the country entered the period of the Metapolitefsi, referring to the transition to democracy. Before the legislative elections in November of the same year, the transitional government headed by Konstantinos Karamanlis came under growing criticism from the opposition, including Georgios Mavros, the leader of the Centre Union - New Forces (the main opposition party at the time), against being too lenient to the members of the recently deposed military junta.

Mavros had demanded the arrest of the junta principals as a condition for cleaning up the political life of the country. He declared that as soon as the parliament was convened after the 1974 elections, he would propose legislation to annul any automatic immunity laws which the junta might have enacted to protect its members.

The press further demanded an investigation into the role of Brigadier Ioannidis during the crushing of the Polytechnic uprising, which the press called a "massacre". Ioannidis was the shadowy leader of the junta's final stage, who had been described as "the invisible dictator" in the press.

Karamanlis' government responded to these demands and ordered the junta principals Georgios Papadopoulos, Stylianos Pattakos, Nikolaos Makarezos, Ioannis Ladas and Michael Roufogalis arrested.

In addition, Georgios Papadopoulos, Dimitrios Ioannidis, Michael Roufogalis, Nikolaos Dertilis, Vassilios Bouklakos and Elias Tsiaouris (alternatively Tsapouris or Tsiaparas), who were also responsible of the Polytechnic events, were prohibited from leaving the country, as rumours were circulating that they were planning to escape abroad.

On 24 October 1974, Georgios Papadopoulos, Stylianos Pattakos, Nikolaos Makarezos, Ioannis Ladas and Michael Roufogalis were arrested and charged with conspiring again. Subsequently, they were sent to the island of Kea.

Ioannidis, was not arrested at that time, with the official explanation that he did not take part in the conspiracy of the Papadopoulos group. However the newspapers, such as To Vima, citied reliable sources, alleging that Ioannidis had disappeared and could not be found.

Immediately after the group of five was exiled to Kea, the opposition demanded to know the details of the actions of Papadopoulos and his co-conspirators prior to their arrest, while the government denied rumours of pro-junta manoeuvres among the military.

During his stay in Kea, Papadopoulos seemed confident that he and the members of his junta would be granted amnesty and they would eventually run for office and get elected. However, following a three-month stay on the island, in February 1975, Papadopoulos and the other four junta principals were transported by a torpedo boat to the port of Piraeus on their way to Korydallos prison. Ioannidis, having meanwhile been arrested on 14 January 1975, was already at the jail when Papadopoulos and his cohorts arrived.

== The instigators ==
=== Trial of the instigators of the 21 April 1967 coup ===
On 28 July 1975, the trial of the instigators of the coup (Greek: Η Δίκη των Πρωταιτίων) commenced with Ioannis Deyannis as the presiding judge. Konstantinos Stamatis and Spyridon Kaninias were the prosecutors.

Deyannis had been appointed to the high court of Areios Pagos during the junta years. The mandate of the trial was to examine the events surrounding the 21 April 1967 coup, for which Papadopoulos and over twenty other co-defendants were charged with acts of high treason and mutiny. Security surrounding the trial was heavy: one thousand soldiers armed with submachine guns were guarding the jail's perimeter, and the roads leading to the jail were patrolled by tanks.

Despite these developments, Papadopoulos expressed his confidence to reporters that he would not remain incarcerated for long. He also assumed full responsibility for the April coup but refused to defend himself. Following Papadopoulos' lead, Stylianos Pattakos, Nikolaos Makarezos and other junta members announced that they also would not participate in the trial. Dimitrios Ioannidis announced that the trial was "unfortunately not interesting".

The defence announced that the reason their clients were not participating was that the Karamanlis government had prejudiced the outcome of the trial by declaring the 1967 coup a criminal offense. The lawyers of sixteen of the defendants walked out of the courtroom on the first day of the proceedings, declaring that they could not carry out their duties under a climate of terror and violence, to which the presiding judge Ioannis Deyannis replied: "Let all those who wish to leave—leave!".

Although there was an agreement among the defendants that they would keep silent during the trial and would not issue any statements, Papadopoulos broke his silence and declared to the court: "I am the leader of the Revolution, and I am responsible for everything". Pattakos, Makarezos and the rest of the junta members were surprised to hear Papadopoulos' statement because they believed they had an agreement that they would not politicize the trial based on their belief that they had nothing to gain. In their view, support among the people and in the army was now non-existent.

The charge of mutiny was contested because even though the colonels had in fact seized power illegally, they did so with the approval of their superior officer Lieutenant General Grigorios Spandidakis, who even joined the coup. Further, Karamanlis himself, by accepting the invitation of junta-appointed President Phaedon Gizikis to return to Greece, conferred a measure of legitimacy to the junta. It was also Gizikis who swore-in Karamanlis as prime minister.

During the trial, Spandidakis, Zoitakis and Stamatelopoulos differentiated their position from that of the other junta members. This divergence from the common defence line led Papadopoulos to strongly chastise one of his defence lawyers for trying to question one of Zoitakis' witnesses. He is reported as exclaiming: "He is not one of our witnesses. Do not ask him [any questions]".

Ioannidis declared to the court: "I accept my participation in the revolution of 21 April 1967. I have always been a soldier throughout my life, and I acted on my duty according to my conscience. I have nothing else to add." Deyannis, replied: "You are not accused of participating in revolution. You are accused of two crimes–do not be afraid of the term–high treason, this term is not very honourable to be attributed to you, and the second crime for which you are being accused is mutiny. Of these two crimes you are accused. Of revolution, you are not accused. What do you plead?" Ioannidis then replied: "I accept my participation in the revolution and any consequences arising from it."

Panagiotis Kanellopoulos, the last legitimate prime minister of Greece prior to the coup, acting as witness for the prosecution, testified how he was arrested by soldiers with machine-guns and transported to the palace to meet King Constantine. He added that during the meeting he urged the king to use his status as commander-in-chief of the Greek military to order loyal officers to rise up against the coup. He stated that Constantine refused to do so because he feared instigating bloodshed.

Kanellopoulos also stated at the trial that, against his advice, King Constantine swore-in the government of the colonels, an action which had helped legitimise their rule. Kanellopoulos' testimony had the effect of undermining the charge of mutiny. Kanellopoulos, during his testimony, also accepted his responsibility "before history" for not preempting the coup. He testified that there was no indication at all that the colonels were plotting "behind the backs" of the highest echelons of the army leadership.

Papadopoulos refused to testify and only declared: "I shall answer only to history and to the Greek people"; to which presiding judge Deyannis retorted: "Do you think history is absent from this courtroom?" Papadopoulos did not respond.

The question of the involvement of the Central Intelligence Agency (CIA) in the coup, a widely held belief in Greece, was not addressed at the trial. Deyannis forbade all discussion on the subject with the remark that the trial was only confined to discovering the facts involved on the day the coup occurred. The only testimony about CIA involvement was given by Andreas Papandreou, who insisted that the colonels worked closely with the CIA.

=== Verdict ===
The trial of the instigators ended on 23 August 1975. Papadopoulos, Nikolaos Makarezos and Stylianos Pattakos were sentenced to death by firing squad, while Dimitrios Ioannidis received a life sentence. Seven others were sentenced to terms ranging from five to 20 years and two were acquitted. The crimes were deemed "momentary" and not "continuous" and considered to have lasted only between 20 and 21 April 1967. The verdict made it impossible to prosecute the collaborators of the junta.

This is the detailed table of the main sentences:

Junta member	Sentence
Georgios Papadopoulos	Death plus a dishonourable discharge
Stylianos Pattakos	Death plus a dishonourable discharge
Nikolaos Makarezos	Death plus a dishonourable discharge
Grigorios Spandidakis, Antonios Lefkas, Nikolaos Dertilis, Dimitrios Ioannidis, Michael Balopoulos, Georgios Konstantopoulos, Theodoros Theophilogiannakos	Life imprisonment plus a dishonourable discharge
Georgios Zoitakis	Life imprisonment plus a dishonourable discharge
Ioannis Ladas, Konstantinos Papadopoulos, Michail Roufogalis, Stefanos Karaberis	Life imprisonment
Dimitrios Stamatelopoulos	5 years imprisonment
Odysseas Angelis	20 years imprisonment plus a dishonourable discharge
Petros Kotselis, Nikolaos Gantonas, Evangelos Tsakas	20 years imprisonment
Konstantinos Aslanidis, Konstantinos Karydas, Alexandros Hatzipetros	Acquitted

The death sentences were later commuted to life incarceration by the Karamanlis government.

On 28 August 1975 Konstantinos Karamanlis declared: "When we say life [sentence], we mean life [sentence]", meaning that the commutation of the sentences from death to life imprisonment would not be followed by further reductions.

Stamatelopoulos disagreed early after the coup with Papadopoulos and started publishing critical articles against the junta regime in the newspaper Vradyni. He was the only defendant for whom mitigating circumstances were considered, especially for having honestly regretted his participation in the coup. With his articles, he helped foster opposition to the regime.

== The Polytechnic ==
=== Trial of the Polytechnic ===
On 16 October 1975, at 9 a.m., the second trial, investigating the events surrounding the Athens Polytechnic uprising (Greek: Η Δίκη του Πολυτεχνείου, translated as the "Trial of the Polytechnic") started in the same courtroom as the first trial, and lasted a total of fifty-seven days. There were thirty-three indicted including Papadopoulos, Ioannidis, M. Roufogalis, Vassilios Bouklakos, Elias Tsiaouris or Tsiaparas and Nikos Dertilis. Papadopoulos, Ioannidis, Roufogalis and Nikos Dertilis were already convicted and serving their sentences from the first trial.

The only defendant not present at the Polytechnic trial was Elias Tsiaouris (or Tsiaparas), accused of murder, who had escaped custody because he was in hiding. There were a total of 237 witnesses for the prosecution and the defence and about 50 lawyers.

The preliminary investigation for the events of the Polytechnic was carried out by prosecutor Dimitrios Tsevas, who submitted the results of his investigation to the office of the prosecutor general on 14 October 1974. In his report, Tsevas determined that Ioannidis and his deputy Roufogalis were on the scene during the events and directed their men with the purpose to create, through shootings and violence, conditions which would benefit Ioannidis' planned coup against Papadopoulos.

Ioannidis and Papadopoulos, even though they were sitting close to each other, never once exchanged a look. During the second trial, a documentary film was shown, shot by Dutch journalists, which showed the events surrounding the three-day occupation of the Polytechnic University, from the time the students entered the university to the crushing of the Polytechnic gates by the tanks. During the projection, Papadopoulos did not pay attention to the film, mostly looking down, while Ioannidis watched the film, reportedly unperturbed.

Antonis Agritelis, driver of Dertilis' jeep, testified that he saw Dertilis execute a youth on Patission Avenue. According to Agritelis' testimony, after the execution, Dertilis reentered the jeep and boasted about his marksmanship. Dertilis disputed Agritelis' testimony but the Court convicted him partly based on this testimony.

Pattakos testified that he called Ioannidis to his office in September 1973 because of rumours that he was planning the overthrow of the Papadopoulos regime. Ioannidis denied the rumours and actually reassured Pattakos, on his "military honour", that he was a supporter of the constitution and of Papadopoulos' reforms. Pattakos also mentioned that he knew very well that in the afternoon of 24 November 1973 Ioannidis had been called by Papadopoulos himself and, with Makarezos present, he again vehemently denied any rumours about planning a coup. Pattakos added that a few hours after that meeting, around 3:30 a.m. the next day, the tanks appeared in the streets of Athens and Phaedon Gizikis was sworn in early that morning as figurehead president of the republic.

On the second day of the trial, Papadopoulos' defence lawyers Karagiannopoulos, Papaspyrou and Steiropoulos raised the objection that the court did not have jurisdictional authority over their client regarding the events of the Polytechnic, because he had Presidential immunity as President of Greece during the time of the events. They demanded an immediate ruling from the court. The court went immediately to recess for further deliberations. Once the proceedings resumed the Court announced it found Papadopoulos was not immune from prosecution, as president of the republic at the time of the events, because the 21 April 1967 coup initiated violence against the Greek State and usurped the power and legal authority of the people. Therefore all subsequent governments of the junta were deemed by the court to be products of violence. Consequently, the Court found that Papadopoulos was not a legitimate president of the republic at the time, and as such not immune from prosecution.

The full, unanimous, decision of the Court, rejecting Papadopoulos' motion for immunity, stated the following:

The mutinous movement of 21 April 1967, the action of a group of officers and the resulting situation until 23 July [1974] constituted a coup d'état, through which it was intended to usurp the authority and the sovereign rights of the people. The consequent governments were governments of violence. Therefore it is clearly concluded that anyone who exercised duties of governmental authority under any office including that of the head of state, did not in reality exercise legal authority and consequently they are not protected for their actions during the exercise of such authority under the regulations which define immunity. Accordingly and the standing as accused Georgios Papadopoulos, having exercised duties as President of the Republic during the time the actions were carried out as are attributed to him by the indictment, he was not the legitimate President of the Republic and therefore he is not protected under the sections of immunity.

Following the ruling about immunity, Ioannidis' lawyer Giorgos Alfantakis made a motion to split and postpone the trial on the grounds that the indictment did not have a complete rationale: although it was mentioned in the order that Ioannidis encouraged and persuaded unit commanders of the security forces to act in a criminal fashion during the suppression of the uprising, the names of the commanders were not mentioned in the indictment. The court rejected the motion on the grounds that it could not annul the indictment.

=== Verdict ===
On 31 December 1975, the five-member court in Athens convicted 20 of the 32 accused and held Ioannidis as the only person morally responsible for the events.

The main sentences are shown in the following table:

Junta member	Sentence
Dimitrios Ioannidis	Seven Life sentences
Georgios Papadopoulos	25 years
Barnabas	Three Life sentences
Nikolaos Dertilis	Life
Zagorianakos	25 years
Mavroidis	25 years
Karayannis	25 years
Lymberis	25 years

== The torturers ==
=== Trials of the torturers ===
In addition to the two civil trials of the instigators and the Polytechnic events, there were another six trials, which concerned the use of torture by the regime (Greek: Οι Δίκες των Βασανιστών, "The Trials of the Torturers"). Two of the trials involved the court martial of members of the EAT/ESA military police. The first trial started 7 August 1975 at the Athens Permanent Martial Court , and the second trial on 13 October 1975, with the verdict announced on 9 December 1975. In total, the defendants totalled 18 officers and 14 soldiers of the non commissioned rank who all faced charges arising from using torture during interrogations. The second trial investigated torture allegations centering on Bogiati jail and in army units located in the Attica Prefecture. These trials were followed by four additional trials involving allegations of torture concerning members of the security forces and the police. The last of the torture trials started in November 1976. Overall there were between one hundred to four hundred torturers' trials. The number is uncertain because detailed centralised records of the number of the trials were not kept.

The charges during the first ESA torturers' trial were:

Repeated abuse of authority, violence against a superior officer, unconstitutional detention, ordinary and serious physical injury, repeated insults to a superior, and recurrent moral responsibility for ordinary or serious physical injury.

Each defendant was charged to a varying degree but the only officer to plead guilty to all of the charges was sergeant Michail Petrou, a former guard at the Athens headquarters of ESA, who returned to Greece from abroad to be tried.

A problem for the prosecution was the theft and destruction of the ESA files, which was described as "wholesale". These files were never recovered and were not used in any of the trials. In fact, documents which were initially exhibited in court by senior ESA officers later vanished without ever being found.

During the EAT/ESA trials, Theodoros Theophilogiannakos pleaded with the army leadership to not convict any of the accused lower-rank EAT/ESA personnel. His rationale was that these convictions would encourage the newly legalised Communist Party to threaten EAT/ESA men with punishment in cases where soldiers executed legally dubious orders. This would demoralize the men and make them second-guess the legality of each order issued to them and disobey orders issued by their commanders. Refusing to obey an order would be illegal within the army and would shake the discipline of the military, Theophilogiannakos argued. He went on to state: "Sentence us, the commanding officers, to death if you like. All that matters is to save the State".

The prosecutor told the Court about Theophilogiannakos:

Guided by a blind anti-communism, he attributed even the slightest opposition to the dictatorial regime to the "Communist finger"

During the second trial Theophilogiannakos asked the court to disallow testimony from Kostas Kappos, a Communist member of parliament, on the grounds that he was an atheist. Spanos, instead of giving testimony, declared that the "revolution" was betrayed like Cyprus. Hadjizisis for his part claimed that the ESA interrogators went through a worse ordeal than the actual interrogation victims.

One of the accused, a doctor Dimitrios Kofas, was notorious as the "orange juice doctor" for prescribing orange juice as a panacea for any ailment, including those resulting from torture. In a case involving Air Force officer Nikolaos Stapas, Kofas prescribed orange juice for hematuria caused by severe torture. The doctor was convicted for eleven documented cases of dereliction of his medical duties.

The closing remarks of the prosecutor in one of the EAT/ESA trials were:

The torturers wanted to present EAT/ESA not as a place of torture but as a national reformatory. Modestly reserving to themselves infallibility of judgement, they have tried to follow in the footsteps of the Holy Inquisition.

=== Verdict ===
Sentencing table for the two ESA trials:

EAT/ESA member	Sentence (first trial)	Sentence (second trial)
Hadjizisis	23 years	7 years
Theophilogiannakos	20 years	7 years
Spanos	20 years	5 years
Tsalas	15 years	4 years
Kofas (nicknamed "the orange juice doctor")	7 years	7 years

== Incarceration ==
In prison the junta principals addressed each other using their former titles such as "Minister" and "President" and showed great deference to Papadopoulos. However, Papadopoulos did not readily socialise and preferred to dine alone. The then-governor of Korydallos Prison, Yannis Papathanassiou, later published the book Prison Diary: Korydallos 1975–79, where he described the amenities that the incarcerated junta members enjoyed, such as air conditioners, television sets and tennis courts.

Papathanassiou in his book describes how the Ministry of Justice, under pressure from junta sympathisers, ordered these special arrangements for the prisoners. Papathanassiou also detailed his continuous vigilance for trying to uncover escape plots. He also revealed how, through their lawyers, the prisoners got involved in the 1977 Greek legislative election supporting a right-wing party. The regular population of the prison became so incensed about the preferential treatment given to the junta members that they rioted.

A plan to grant amnesty to the junta principals by the Konstantinos Mitsotakis government in 1990 was cancelled after protests from conservatives, socialists and communists alike.

Papadopoulos and seven other members of the junta were housed in the maximum security A-block. Papadopoulos resided on the second floor of the compound along with the other members of his regime, while Ioannidis resided on the ground floor.

Although Pattakos and Makarezos were let out of jail early for health reasons, Papadopoulos never asked for clemency and remained in jail until his death. He died in hospital on 27 June 1999, after being transferred from Korydallos.

During his incarceration, Ioannidis was reported as reading military books and books about the CIA. Because of his involvement in Papadopoulos' overthrow, he was accused by the right wing as having betrayed the oath he gave in the summer of 1971 before Papadopoulos and another twenty junta members that he would recognise Papadopoulos as the leader of the "revolution", and thus he was held responsible in their eyes for the subsequent events, especially the regime's ultimate collapse. Ioannidis avoided contact with Papadopoulos and the other junta members around him, and he spent most of his time alone in an isolated cell. Despite that, he sometimes arranged parties attended by members of the ESA military police, who resided on the third floor of the compound.

Ioannidis and co-conspirator Nikos Dertilis never asked for a pardon. By the end of 2005, lawyers representing Ioannidis and Dertilis petitioned the court for their release, though Ioannidis declared that he did not regret any of his actions. The Court of Justice in Piraeus declined his petition based on his lack of remorse. In 2008, Ioannidis was transferred to the General State Hospital of Nikaia from Korydallos due to illness. Ioannidis died on 16 August 2010 from respiratory problems, having been taken to hospital the previous night. He remained incarcerated until his death.

Stylianos Pattakos, even in jail, exhibited continued devotion to Papadopoulos. It is reported that he enjoyed listening to religious music supplied to him by a monk, and in his prison memoirs Pattakos describes how he enjoyed tending a small garden and a little pond with 21 goldfish. The two things he mentions in his writings that he did not like was the noise pollution at the jail, which he describes as "torture", and that the shape of the pond and faucet combination looked like a hammer and sickle.

In another segment of his prison memoirs, Pattakos also mentions an incident involving General Odysseas Angelis (the Chief of the Armed Forces under much of the junta), and a jail guard. According to Pattakos the jail guard had his radio volume high and Angelis pleaded with the guard to lower it. The guard did not comply but raised the volume higher. Angelis then asked Pattakos to intervene on his behalf and ask the "noble jail guard" again.

On 23 March 1987 Angelis committed suicide in his cell, at the age of 75. Pattakos was released from jail in September 1990 due to "irreparable damage to his health".

Dertilis was the last remaining junta member in jail. He died 28 January 2013 at the age of 94.

Stamatelopoulos was pardoned in April 1977.

== Legacy ==
The successful prosecution of the junta and the heavy sentences imposed on the junta principals sent a message to potential conspirators within the army ranks that the era of immunity from constitutional transgressions by the military was over.

The EAT/ESA torture trials were acknowledged by Amnesty International as the first trials internationally, since the Nuremberg Trials, to involve prosecution of torture. The EAT/ESA trials are also among the very few trials of torturers in human history and are referred to as the "Criminals' Trials" by Amnesty International. Because it is rare for a country to prosecute torturers, these trials have become the subject of study and papers have been published based on their court proceedings.

In 1977, Amnesty International published a report about the first torturers' trial in Greece with the dual purpose of documenting the use of torture in a modern oppressive regime and using it as an example of prosecution of officials who torture, believing that the Greek experience can benefit the rest of the world.

The trials of the junta also served to demystify the myth of the competent, professional, incorruptible and ethical military strongman. According to the books The Politics of Human Rights: The Quest for Dignity and Transitional Justice: How Emerging Democracies Reckon With Former Regimes : Country Studies:

[T]he trials, which received widespread radio, television, and press coverage, served to demystify the dictatorship. The trials made possible the exposure of seven years of maladministration, repression, scandal, corruption, and conspiracies and depicted a regime much worse than even the military had imagined. The details of torture, particularly of distinguished senior military officers by subordinates, were most offensive to the professional officer class. The statements and the demeanor of the accused revealed to many their pettiness and their incompetence and destroyed within seconds the military image of the strong man. The trials exposed the 'supermen' without their clothes, and what the public and the officer corps saw, they did not like. If we add to this their responsibility for the Cyprus tragedy, we can understand the dissillusionment of the officer corps with the military as politicians and its desire to separate itself from the regime of the phoenix and the bayonet.

== Media ==
- The Trial of the Junta from IMDB film. Directed by T. Theodosopoulos, produced by Maggos Theodosopoulos, Music by G. Yiannoulatos and Songs by Alkistis Protopsalti.
- Prison Diary: Korydallos 1975-79 book. Yannis Papathanassiou
- The Trial, book. Ioannis Deyannis. Gnosi publications 1990.
- Diki ton vasaniston: EAT/ESA 1967-74, I (1982) (Trial of the torturers on IMDB)
- Book: The Trials of the Junta, 12 Volumes (Pericles Rodakis (publisher), The Trials of the Junta: A: The Trial of the Instigators, B: The Trial of the Polytechnic, C: The Trials of the Torturers) [Περικλής Ροδάκης (εκδ.), Οι Δίκες της Χούντας: Α: Η Δίκη των Πρωταιτίων, Β: Η Δίκη του Πολυτεχνείου, Γ: Οι Δίκες των Βασανιστών, 12 τόμοι, Αθήνα 1975-1976]

== See also ==
- Trial of the Juntas, in Argentina
- Greek Civil War
- White Terror (Greece)
