= Social engineering (political science) =

Discipline in social science

Social engineering is influencing particular attitudes and social behaviors on a large scale. This is often undertaken by governments, or mass media, but may also be carried out by academia or private groups in order to produce desired characteristics in a target population.

== Origin of concept ==
The Dutch industrialist J.C. van Marken (nl) used the term sociale ingenieurs ("social engineers") in an essay in 1894. The idea was that modern employers needed the assistance of specialists in handling the human challenges, just as they needed technical expertise (traditional engineers) to deal with non-human challenges (materials, machines, processes). "Social engineering" was the title of a small journal in 1899 (renamed "Social Service" from 1900), and in 1909 it was the title of a book by the journal's former editor, William H. Tolman (translated into French in 1910). With the Social Gospel sociologist Edwin L. Earp's The Social Engineer, published during the "efficiency craze" of 1911 in the U.S., a new usage of the term was launched that has since then become standard: "Social engineering" came to refer to an approach of treating social relations as "machineries", to be dealt with in the manner of the technical engineer.

== Historical examples ==
In the 1920s, the government of the Soviet Union embarked on a campaign to fundamentally alter the behavior and ideals of Soviet citizens, to replace the old social frameworks of the Russian Empire with a new Soviet culture, and to develop the New Soviet man. Commissars became agents of social engineering.

In India, social engineering was said to have been done by the state of Bihar, on a grand scale, to unify different castes after 2005.

In his political science book, The Open Society and Its Enemies, volume I, The Spell of Plato (1945), Karl Popper made a distinction between the principles of what he called "piecemeal social engineering" and Utopian social engineering.

== See also ==
- Media manipulation – Techniques in which partisans create an image that favours their interests
- Nudge theory – Concept in behavioral economics, political theory and behavioral sciences
- Political engineering – The designing of political institutions, to try to achieve some desired political effect
- Propaganda – Communication used to influence opinion
- Psychological operations – Information operations to assist military objectives
- Social control – Concept in the social and political sciences
- Social policy – Action of institutional agencies that aim to improve society
