= Ioannis Ladas =

Greek politician and military officer

- Ιωάννης Λαδάς

Minister of Social Services of Greece
- In office 31 July 1972 – 8 October 1973
- Prime Minister: Georgios Papadopoulos
- Preceded by: Antonios Bernares
- Succeeded by: Charalampos Panagiotopoulos

Deputy Minister of Thessaly
- In office 26 August 1971 – 31 July 1972
- Prime Minister: Georgios Papadopoulos
- Preceded by: Position established
- Succeeded by: Christos Michalos

Personal details
- Born: 1920 Dyrrachio, Greece
- Died: 16 October 2010 (aged 89–90) Zografou, Greece
- Resting place: Kalamata, Greece
- Party: Independent
- Spouse: Efrosyni Kessari
- Children: 2
- Education: Hellenic Military Academy
- Occupation: Military officer; politician; writer
- Nicknames: Scissorhands; clean hands; long-haired hunter

Military service
- Allegiance: Greece
- Branch/service: Hellenic Army; Infantry
- Years of service: 1937–1968
- Rank: Colonel
- Unit: Sacred Squadron
- Commands: Chief of the Greek Military Police
- Battles/wars: World War II; Greco-Italian War; Greek resistance; Dekemvriana; Greek Civil War; 1967 Greek coup d'état
- Awards: Cross of Valour; War Cross; Medal of Military Merit
- Criminal information
- Status: Deceased
- Criminal charges: Treason; Mutiny

Ioannis Ladas (Greek: Ιωάννης Λαδάς; 1920 – 16 October 2010) was a Hellenic Army officer who served as the chief of the Greek Military Police. He was a member of the military junta that ruled Greece from 1967 to 1973. He served as Minister of Social Services (1972–1973) and Deputy Minister of Thessaly (1971–1972) under Georgios Papadopoulos.

== Early life ==
Ioannis Ladas was born in 1920, in Dyrrachio.

In 1940, he graduated from the Hellenic Military Academy along with George Papadopoulos and Nikolaos Makarezos. He fought, as an officer, in the Greco-Italian War of 1940.

== Political involvement ==
=== 4th of August Party ===
In the mid 1960s, Ladas had been associated with a small, far-right 4th of August Party, and contributed many articles to the party's journal, which the British historian Richard Clogg called a "racist and anti-Semitic" magazine which glorified not only the 4th of August Regime, but also the Third Reich. As a colonel in 1967, he was in charge of the Greek Military Police stationed in Athens and ordered the arrest of several prominent politicians and military personnel not allied to the orchestrators of the coup d'état. He first served in the resulting regime as general secretary in the ministries of public order and tourism.

=== Rant against homosexuality ===
In the summer of 1968, Ladas stormed into the office of the magazine Eikones and personally beat up its editor Panayiotis Lambrias. Ladas had been enraged at Eikones because it published an article saying that homosexuality was accepted as normal in ancient Greece. When the BBC's Greek service reported the incident, Ladas gave a much publicised rant at a press conference, denouncing the BBC as he maintained that all of its journalists were homosexuals who were biased against him. The rant made him into a sort of unofficial spokesman for the regime.

=== Greek supremacist views ===
At a subsequent speech before a visiting group of sympathetic Greek-Americans on 6 August 1968 who come to offer their support, Ladas quoted Friderich Nietzsche's statement that the ancient Greeks invented everything and went on to say: "Foreigners confess and acknowledge Greek superiority. Human civilization was wholly fashioned by our race. Even the enemies of Greece recognize that civilization is an exclusively Greek creation". In the same speech, Ladas denounced young men with long hair as "the degenerate phenomenon of hippyism", calling hippies "anti-social elements, drug addicts, sex maniacs, thieves, etc. It is only natural that they should be enemies of the army and the ideals which the military way of life serves". Ladas ended his speech by arguing that Greeks for racial reasons were still the world's preeminent people, but had only declined of inadequate leadership, a problem which had been solved by the "revolution" of 21 April 1967. Ladas claimed that Greece under military leadership would be "cured" of its problems and resume its rightful place in the world.

=== Minister in the Junta ===
Later, he was minister for the interior and for social services.

== Imprisonment and death ==
On 23 August 1975, he was sentenced to life imprisonment during the Greek Junta Trials. He was released from prison in September 1990 for health reasons.

He married Efrosyni Kessari and they had two children, Ilias (b. 1949), and Kalliopi (b. 1956).

He died at his home, in Zografou, on 16 October 2010, at age 90. He was buried on 20 October 2010, in Kalamata.

== Books ==
- Clogg, Richard (1971). "The Ideology of the "revolution of 21 April 1967"". In Richard Clogg; George Yannopoloulos (eds.). Greece Under Military Rule. London: Secker & Warburg. pp. 36–58.
