= Your Neighbor's Son =

1976 Danish docudrama

- Directed by: Jørgen Flindt Pedersen; Erik Stephensen
- Produced by: Ebbe Preisler
- Cinematography: Alexander Gruszynski
- Edited by: Peter Engleson
- Music by: Argiris Kounadis
- Release date: 1981
- Running time: 65 minutes (1981); 55 minutes (1983)
- Country: Denmark
- Languages: Greek; English subtitles

Your Neighbor's Son: The Making of a Torturer (Danish: Din nabos søn or Din nabos soen) is a Danish documentary or docudrama directed by Jørgen Flindt Pedersen and Erik Stephensen in two versions, 1981 and 1983. The film documents the conversion of young Greek Military Police (ESA) recruits into torturers during the military junta known as the Regime of the Colonels that ruled Greece from 1967 to 1974. The film touches on the power of the institution to compel otherwise moral human beings to torture.

== Plot ==
The documentary dramatizes the recruiting and training of a number of young men into the Greek police force during the military junta rule. A number of otherwise decent young men are selected based on a number of traits viewed as exploitable by the recruiters: that they are illiterate, anti-communist, young and male, drawing comparisons to the Cambodian torturers at Tuol Sleng, many of whom were under 19 years old.

The film also interviews Michalis Petrou, a conscript who served in the Military Police and was trained to become one of the most notorious torturers of the EAT-ESA. Petrou's testimony reveals that the training methods themselves were brutal and often torturous and was viewed as a necessity to ensure the robotic and brutal obedience of the trainees. According to him, during that period, he was capable of any torture method, if he was so ordered.

During the dramatic recreation of the training camps, the directors draw parallels to modern military recruit trainings and the methods used in the training of the military police torturers.

== Response ==
The New York Times columnist Lawrence Van Gelder stated that while the film was technically flawed it was at the same time "memorable and unnerving" in its depiction of both the victims of the torture as well as the ordeals of the torturers themselves, and claimed "it is impossible to regard its torturers or its victims without realizing that the view may be a view into a mirror." Variety praised the directors as having "delivered a clean semi-documentary work without hysteria and with fine visual control plus well controlled dramatics", but argued the film's claim that "any brutal dictatorship could turn any clear-headed and clean-minded boy of city or farmland into a police torturer of prisoners if properly trained" was "somewhat belied by this semi-documentary's early admission of the fact that primarily illiterate young men of violently anti-Communist families were recruited in the first place."

== See also ==
- Eichmann in Jerusalem book by Hannah Arednt, about the Nuremberg trials, which introduced the concept of "the banality of evil"
- The Act of Killing, 2012 documentary by Joshua Oppenheimer, interviewing torturers involved in the Indonesian mass killings of 1965–66
- Stanford prison experiment, 1971 psychological experiment in which ordinary civilians are instructed to apply torture to experiment subjects.
