= Greek junta =

Greece under military junta (1967–1974)

Kingdom of Greece (1967–1973); Βασίλειον τῆς Ἑλλάδος; Hellenic Republic (1973–1974); Ἑλληνικὴ Δημοκρατία
- 1967–1974
- Flag (1970–1975) Coat of arms (1973–1974)
- Motto: Ἑλλὰς Ἑλλήνων Χριστιανῶν! Greece of Christian Greeks!
- Anthem: Ὕμνος εἰς τὴν Ἐλευθερίαν "Hymn to Liberty"; Ο Ύμνος της 21ης Απριλίου "Anthem of the 21st of April" (unofficial)
- Map of Europe in 1973, showing Greece highlighted in green
- Capital: Athens
- Common languages: Greek
- Religion: Greek Orthodoxy
- Demonyms: Greek, Hellene
- Government: Unitary constitutional monarchy under a military dictatorship (1967–1973); Unitary semi-presidential republic under a military dictatorship (1 June to 25 November 1973); Unitary quasi-parliamentary republic under a military dictatorship (25 November 1973 to 24 July 1974)
- Monarchy
  - King 1967–1973: Constantine II
  - Regent 1967–1972 1972–1973: Georgios Zoitakis; Georgios Papadopoulos
- President
  - 1973: Georgios Papadopoulos
  - 1973–1974: Phaedon Gizikis
- Prime Minister
  - 1967: Konstantinos Kollias
  - 1967–1973: Georgios Papadopoulos
  - 1973: Spyros Markezinis
  - 1973–1974: Adamantios Androutsopoulos
- Legislature: Hellenic Parliament (nominal, suspended; de-facto ruled by decree)
- Historical era: Cold War
  - Coup d'état of 21 April: 21 April 1967
  - Constantine II's counter-coup attempt and Constantine's II exile: 13 December 1967
  - Constitutional referendum: 15 November 1968
  - Republic declared: 1 June 1973
  - Republic referendum: 29 July 1973
  - Polytechnic Uprising and coup d'état led by Ioannidis against Papadapoulos: 14–17 November 1973 and 25 November 1973
  - 1974 Cypriot coup d'état and Turkish invasion of Cyprus: 15 July 1974 and 20 July 1974
  - Democratisation: 24 July 1974

Area
  - Total: 131,957 km^{2} (50,949 sq mi)

Population
  - 1971 census: 8,768,372
- Currency: Greek drachma (GRD)
Preceded by	Succeeded by
Kingdom of Greece	Third Hellenic Republic
- Today part of: Greece

The Greek junta or Regime of the Colonels (Note: Greek: καθεστώς των Συνταγματαρχών, romanised: kathestós ton Syntagmatarchón, IPA: [kaθesˈtos ton sindaɣmatarˈxon].) was a right-wing military junta that ruled Greece from 1967 to 1974. On 21 April 1967, a group of colonels overthrew a caretaker government a month before scheduled elections which Georgios Papandreou's Centre Union was favoured to win.

The dictatorship was characterised by policies such as anti-communism, restrictions on civil liberties, and the imprisonment, torture, and exile of political opponents. Its hardline policies brought increasing isolation on the international stage, peaking with the regime withdrawing from the Council of Europe in 1969. It was ruled by Georgios Papadopoulos from 1967 to 1973, but an attempt to renew popular support in a 1973 referendum on the monarchy and gradual democratisation by Papadopoulos was ended by another coup by the hardliner Dimitrios Ioannidis. Ioannidis ruled until it fell on 24 July 1974 under the pressure of the Turkish invasion of Cyprus, leading to the Metapolitefsi (Greek: Μεταπολίτευση, lit. 'regime change') to democracy and the establishment of the Third Hellenic Republic.

== Background ==
The 1967 coup d'état and the following seven years of military rule were the culmination of 30 years of national division between the forces of the left and the right that can be traced to the time of the resistance against Axis occupation of Greece during World War II.

Worried by the strength of the communist partisan forces, National Liberation Front and ELAS, Winston Churchill and Joseph Stalin drew up a secret document known as the percentages agreement, which sought to avoid further conflict in Europe by dividing up Western and Soviet spheres of influence. In this negotiation, Greece was viewed by the British as an important asset against further communist progression into Europe. After the country's liberation in 1944, Greece descended into Civil War (1946–1949), fought between the communist forces and those loyal to the newly returned government-in-exile. Clashes between the communist resistance and the Greek collaborationist Security Battalions, largely recruited as part of an anti-communist effort during World War II, led to further post-war political instability. One such was the Battle of Meligalas in 1944, in which partisans court martialled and then executed hundreds of collaborationist fighters and the villagers housing them. Right-wing governments from the post-war period until it was ended during the Metapolitefsi continued to commemorate the anniversary as a marker of left-wing violence, and the event has remained a flash-point for generations.

=== American influence in Greece ===
In 1944, British prime minister Winston Churchill was determined to halt the Soviet encroachment in the Balkans, and ordered British forces to intervene in the Greek Civil War (see Dekemvriana) in the wake of the retreating German military. This was to be a lengthy and open-ended commitment by the British. The United States stepped in to further help the Greek government against the communist forces in 1947.

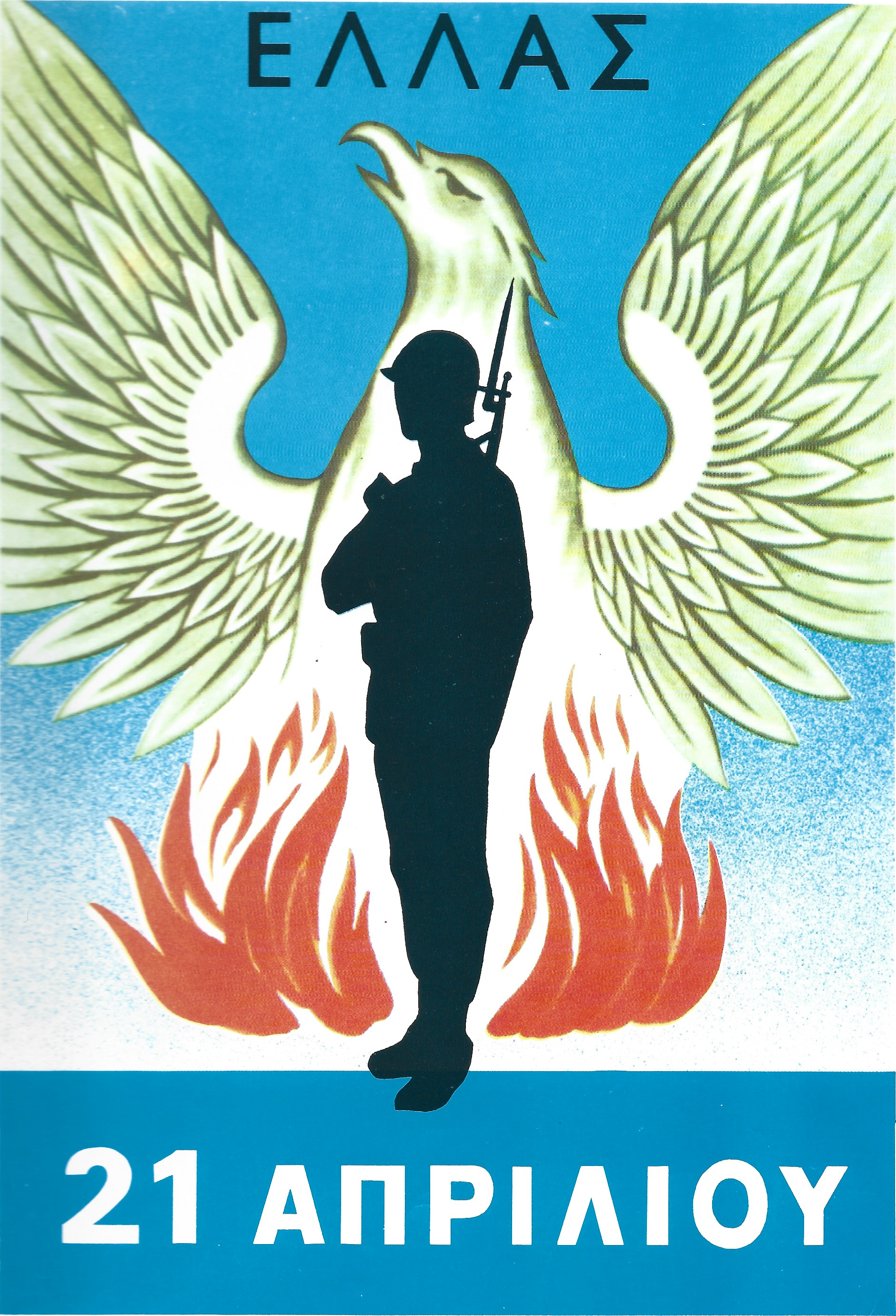
The Phoenix rising from its flames and the silhouette of the soldier bearing a rifle with fixed bayonet was the emblem of the Junta. On the header the word "Greece" (Ελλάς) and on the footer "21 April", the date of the 1967 coup d'état, can be seen in Greek.

In 1947, the United States formulated the Truman Doctrine, and began actively supporting a series of authoritarian governments in Greece, Turkey, and Iran in order to ensure that these states did not fall under Soviet influence. In 1945, officer veterans of the Security Battalions had organised themselves into a secret society known as the IDEA (Ieros Desmos Ellinon Axiomatikon–Holy Bond of Greek Officers). Several of the future leaders of the junta, such as Georgios Papadopoulos, were members of IDEA. With American and British aid, the civil war ended with the military defeat of the communists in 1949. The Communist Party of Greece (KKE) and its ancillary organisations were outlawed (Law 509/1947), and many Communists either fled the country or faced persecution. The CIA and the Greek military began to work together closely, especially after Greece joined the North Atlantic Treaty Organization (NATO) in 1952. This included notable CIA officers Gust Avrakotos and Clair George. Avrakotos maintained a close relationship with the colonels who would figure in the later coup.

In 1952, IDEA issued a manifesto stating that a dictatorship was the only possible solution to Greece's problems, which the Greek scholar Christos Kassimeris called an "astonishing" statement, since the communists had been defeated in 1949, Greece was enjoying a period of relative prosperity after living standards had collapsed in the 1940s, and Greek politics were stable. Kassimeris argued that since Papadopoulos played a large role in writing the 1952 manifesto, that it was his "personal ambition" rather than objective fear of the sway of Greek communists as motivation. In no way could Greece be presented as on the brink of a communist take-over in 1952.

Greece was a vital link in the NATO defence arc which extended from the eastern border of Pakistan to the northernmost point in Norway. Greece in particular was seen as being at risk, having experienced a communist insurgency. In particular, the newly founded Hellenic National Intelligence Service (EYP) and the Mountain Raiding Companies (LOK) maintained a very close liaison with their American counterparts. In addition to preparing for a Soviet invasion, they agreed to guard against a left-wing coup. The LOK in particular were integrated into the European stay-behind network. Although there have been persistent rumours about an active support of the coup by the U.S. government, there is no evidence to support such claims. The timing of the coup apparently caught the CIA by surprise. However the U.S. has acknowledged their role in supporting the Junta in the years following the coup.

== Iouliana and political instability ==
After many years of conservative rule, the election of the Centre Union's Georgios Papandreou as prime minister was a sign of change. In a bid to gain more control over the country's government than his limited constitutional powers allowed, the young and inexperienced King Constantine II clashed with liberal reformers. In July 1964, Papandreou announced his intention to fire those officers belonging to IDEA, whom the king did not want dismissed, claiming it was his royal prerogative to protect the IDEA officers, which in turn led to massive demonstrations in Athens, which had a republican flavour. In July 1965, Papandreou offered his resignation not expecting it to be accepted, but the hasty acceptance from the king caused a constitutional crisis known as the "Iouliana of 1965".

After making several attempts to form governments, relying on dissident Centre Union and conservative MPs, Constantine II appointed an interim government under Ioannis Paraskevopoulos, and new elections were called for 28 May 1967. There were many indications that Papandreou's Centre Union would emerge as the largest party, but would not be able to form a single-party government and would be forced into an alliance with the United Democratic Left, which was suspected by conservatives of being a proxy for the banned KKE. This possibility was used as a pretext for the coup.

To end the political deadlock, Georgios Papandreou attempted a more moderate approach with the king, but his son Andreas Papandreou publicly rejected his father's effort and attacked the whole establishment, attracting the support of 41 members of the Center Union in an effort designed to gain the party's leadership and preventing any compromise.

=== A "Generals' Coup" ===
Greek historiography and journalists have hypothesised about a "Generals' Coup", a coup that would have been deployed at Constantine's behest under the pretext of combating communist subversion.

Before the elections that were scheduled for 28 May 1967, with expectations of a wide Center Union victory, a number of conservative National Radical Union politicians feared that the policies of left-wing Centrists, including Andreas Papandreou (the son of Georgios Papandreou), would lead to a constitutional crisis. One such politician, George Rallis, proposed that, in case of such an "anomaly", the King should declare martial law as the monarchist constitution permitted him. According to Rallis, Constantine was receptive to the idea.

According to U.S. diplomat John Day, Washington also worried that Andreas Papandreou would have a very powerful role in the next government, because of his father's old age. According to Robert Keely and John Owens, American diplomats present in Athens at the time, Constantine asked U.S. Ambassador William Phillips Talbot what the American attitude would be to an extra-parliamentary solution to the problem. To this the embassy responded negatively in principle – adding, however, that, "U.S. reaction to such a move cannot be determined in advance but would depend on circumstances at the time." Constantine denies this. According to Talbot, Constantine met the army generals, who promised him that they would not take any action before the coming elections. However, the proclamations of Andreas Papandreou made them nervous, and they resolved to re-examine their decision after seeing the results of the elections.

In 1966, Constantine sent his envoy, Demetrios Bitsios, to Paris on a mission to persuade former prime minister Konstantinos Karamanlis to return to Greece and resume his prior role in politics. According to uncorroborated claims made by the former monarch, Karamanlis replied to Bitsios that he would return only if the King imposed martial law, as was his constitutional prerogative. According to Cyrus L. Sulzberger correspondent for The New York Times, Karamanlis flew to New York City to meet with USAF General Lauris Norstad to lobby for a conservative coup that would establish Karamanlis as Greece's leader; Sulzberger alleges that Norstad declined to involve himself in such affairs. Sulzberger's account rests solely on the authority of his and Norstad's word. When, in 1997, the former King reiterated Sulzberger's allegations, Karamanlis stated that he "will not deal with the former king's statements, because both their content and attitude are unworthy of comment".

The deposed King's adoption of Sulzberger's claims against Karamanlis was castigated by Greece's left-leaning media, which denounced Karamanlis as "shameless" and "brazen". At the time Constantine referred exclusively to Sulzberger's account to support the theory of a planned coup by Karamanlis, and made no mention of the alleged 1966 meeting with Bitsios, which he referred to only after both participants had died and could not respond.

As it turned out, the constitutional crisis did not originate either from the political parties, or from the Palace, but from middle-rank army putschists.

== Coup d'état of 21 April ==
1967 Greek coup d'état
Date	21 April 1967
Location	Athens, Greece
Result	Coup successful: Establishment of the Greek junta

Belligerents
Greek Government; Centre Union; National Radical Union; United Democratic Left	Hellenic Armed Forces; Hellenic Army; Hellenic Navy; Hellenic Air Force

Commanders and leaders
Constantine II; Panagiotis Kanellopoulos; Georgios Papandreou	Georgios Papadopoulos; Stylianos Pattakos; Nikolaos Makarezos; Ioannis Ladas; Dimitrios Patilis

Units involved
	5,000 servicemen, on foot or on tanks or armoured cars

On 21 April 1967, just weeks before the scheduled elections, a group of right-wing army officers led by Brigadier Stylianos Pattakos and Colonels Georgios Papadopoulos and Nikolaos Makarezos seized power in a coup d'état. The colonels were able to seize power quickly by using elements of surprise and confusion. Pattakos was the commander of the Armour Training Centre (Κέντρο Εκπαίδευσης Τεθωρακισμένων, ΚΕΤΘ), based in Athens.

The coup leaders placed tanks in strategic positions in Athens, effectively gaining complete control of the city. At the same time, a large number of small mobile units were dispatched to arrest leading politicians, authority figures, and ordinary citizens suspected of left-wing sympathies, according to lists prepared in advance. One of the first to be arrested was Lieutenant General Grigorios Spandidakis, Commander-in-Chief of the Greek Army. The colonels persuaded Spandidakis to join them, having him activate a previously drafted action plan to move the coup forward. Under the command of paratrooper Brigadier General Kostas Aslanides, the LOK took over the Greek Defence Ministry while Pattakos gained control of communication centres, the parliament, the royal palace, and – according to detailed lists – arrested over 10,000 people.

By the early morning hours, the whole of Greece was in the hands of the colonels. All leading politicians, including acting prime minister Panagiotis Kanellopoulos, had been arrested and were held incommunicado by the conspirators. At 6:00 a.m. EET, Papadopoulos announced that eleven articles of the Greek constitution were suspended. One of the consequences of these suspensions was that anyone could be arrested without warrant at any time and brought before a military court to be tried. Ioannis Ladas, then the director of ESA, recounted in a later interview that "Within twenty minutes every politician, every man, every anarchist who was listed could be rounded up ... It was a simple, diabolical plan". Georgios Papandreou was arrested after a nighttime raid at his villa in Kastri, Attica. Andreas was arrested at around the same time, after seven soldiers armed with fixed bayonets and a machine gun forcibly entered his home. Andreas Papandreou escaped to the roof of his house, but surrendered after one of the soldiers held a gun to the head of his then-fourteen-year-old son George Papandreou.

Papadopoulos' junta attempted to re-engineer the Greek political landscape by coup. Papadopoulos as well as the other junta members are known in Greece by the term "Aprilianoi" (Aprilians), denoting the month of the coup. The term "Aprilianoi" has become synonymous with the term "dictators of 1974".

=== Role of the King ===
When the tanks came to the streets of Athens on 21 April, the legitimate National Radical Union government, of which Rallis was a member, asked King Constantine to immediately mobilise the state against the coup; he declined to do so, and swore in a new government in accordance with the putschists' stipulations.

The King, who had relented and decided to co-operate, claimed till his death that he was isolated and did not know what else to do. He has since claimed that he was trying to gain time to organise a counter-coup and oust the Junta. He did organise such a counter-coup; however, the fact that the new government had legal sanction, in that it had been appointed by the legitimate head of state, played an important role in the coup's success. The King was later to regret his decision bitterly. For many Greeks, it served to identify him indelibly with the coup and certainly played an important role in the final decision to abolish the monarchy, sanctioned by the 1974 referendum.

The only concession the King could achieve was to appoint a civilian as prime minister. While the junta wanted Spandidakis for the post, at Constantine's insistence Konstantinos Kollias, a former Attorney General of the Areios Pagos (supreme court), was chosen. He was a well-known royalist and had even been disciplined under the Papandreou government for meddling in the investigation of the murder of MP Gregoris Lambrakis. Kollias was little more than a figurehead and real power rested with the army, and especially Papadopoulos, who emerged as the coup's strong man and became Minister to the Presidency of the Government. Other coup members occupied key posts.

Up until then constitutional legitimacy had been preserved, since under the Greek Constitution the King could appoint whomever he wanted as prime minister, as long as Parliament endorsed the appointment with a vote of confidence or a general election was called. It was this government, sworn in during the early evening hours of 21 April, that formalised the coup. It adopted a "Constituent Act", an amendment tantamount to a revolution, cancelling the elections and effectively abolishing the constitution, which would be replaced later.

In the meantime, the government was to rule by decree. Since traditionally such Constituent Acts did not need to be signed by the Crown, the King never signed it, permitting him to claim, years later, that he had never signed any document instituting the junta. Critics claim that Constantine II did nothing to prevent the government (and especially his chosen prime minister, Kollias) from legally instituting the authoritarian government to come. This same government published and enforced a decree, already proclaimed on radio as the coup was in progress, instituting martial law. Constantine claimed he never signed that decree either.

=== King's counter-coup ===
King Constantine's counter-coup attempt
Date	13 December 1967
Location	Kavala, Greece
Result	Coup attempt failed: King Constantine sent into exile.; Monarchy abolished in 1973.

Belligerents
Monarchy loyalists: Army dissidents	Greek junta

Commanders and leaders
Constantine II; Konstantinos Kollias	Georgios Papadopoulos

From the outset, the relationship between Constantine and the colonels was an uneasy one. The colonels were not willing to share power, whereas the young king, like his father before him, was used to playing an active role in politics and would never consent to being a mere figurehead, especially in a military administration. Although the colonels' strong anti-communist, pro-NATO, and pro-Western views appealed to the United States, President Lyndon B. Johnson – in an attempt to avoid an international backlash – told Constantine that it would be best to replace the junta with a new government according to Paul Ioannidis in his book Destiny Prevails: My life with Aristóteles Onassis. Constantine took that as an encouragement to organise a counter-coup, although no direct help or involvement of the U.S. (or Britain) was forthcoming.

The King finally decided to launch his counter-coup on 13 December 1967. Since Athens was militarily in the hands of the colonels, Constantine decided to fly to the small northern city of Kavala, where he hoped to be among troops loyal only to him. The vague plan that Constantine and his advisors had conceived was to form a unit that would invade and take control over Thessaloniki, where an alternative administration would be installed. Constantine hoped that international recognition and internal pressure between the two governments would force the junta to resign, leaving the field clear for him to return triumphant to Athens.

In the early morning hours of 13 December, the King boarded the royal plane, together with Queen Anne-Marie, their two baby children Princess Alexia and Crown Prince Pavlos, his mother Frederika, and his sister, Princess Irene. Constantine also took with him Prime Minister Kollias. At first, things seemed to be going according to plan. Constantine was well received in Kavala, which was under the command of a general loyal to him. The Hellenic Air Force and Navy, both strongly royalist and not involved in the junta, immediately declared for him and mobilised. Another of Constantine's generals effectively cut all communication between Athens and northern Greece.

However, Constantine's plans were overly bureaucratic, naïvely supposing that orders from a commanding general would automatically be obeyed. In the circumstances, middle-ranking pro-junta officers neutralised and arrested Constantine's royalist generals and took command of their units, and subsequently put together a force to advance on Kavala to arrest the King. The junta, not at all shaken by the loss of their figurehead premier, ridiculed Constantine by announcing that he was hiding "from village to village".

Realising that the counter-coup had failed, Constantine fled Greece on board the royal plane, taking his family and the helpless Kollias with him. They landed in Rome early in the morning of 14 December. Constantine remained in exile during the remainder of military rule. Although he subsequently returned to Greece, the abolition of the monarchy in 1973 via referendum removed his status as King.

=== Regency ===
The flight of Constantine and Kollias left Greece with no legal government or head of state. This did not concern the military junta. Instead the Revolutionary Council, composed of Pattakos, Papadopoulos, and Makarezos, appointed another member to the military administration, Major General Georgios Zoitakis, as regent. Zoitakis then appointed Papadopoulos as prime minister. This became the only government of Greece following the failure of the King's attempted counter-coup, as Constantine was unwilling to set up an alternative administration in exile.

In hopes of giving legal sanction to the regime, the junta drafted a new constitution. It made the military the guardians of "social and political order", with wide autonomy from governmental and parliamentary oversight. It also heavily circumscribed the activities of political parties. The new constitution was approved in a 15 November referendum, with over 92 per cent approval. However, the referendum was conducted in less-than-free circumstances; the regime deployed extensive propaganda in favour of the new document while muzzling any opposition. Under the new constitution, the regency would continue until elections were held, unless the junta called Constantine back sooner (though Constantine never acknowledged, let alone recognised, the regency). However, the junta announced that the "Revolution of April 21" (as the regime called itself) would need time to reform the "Greek mentality" before holding elections. It also suspended most of the constitution's guarantees of civil rights until the restoration of civilian rule.

In a legally controversial move, even under the junta's own Constitution, the Cabinet voted on 21 March 1972 to oust Zoitakis and replace him with Papadopoulos, thus combining the offices of regent and prime minister. It was thought Zoitakis was problematic and interfered too much with the military. The King's portrait remained on coins, in public buildings, etc., but slowly, the military chipped away at the institution of the monarchy: the royal family's tax immunity was abolished, the complex network of royal charities was brought under direct state control, the royal arms were removed from coins, the Navy and Air Force dropped their "Royal" names, and newspapers were prohibited from publishing the King's photo or any interviews.

During this period, resistance against the colonels' rule became better organised among exiles in Europe and the United States. There was also considerable political infighting within the junta. Still, up until 1973, the junta appeared in firm control of Greece, and not likely to be ousted by violent means.

== Junta characteristics ==
=== Ideology ===
Under the regime, the old flag of the Navy became the sole national flag. A darker shade of blue was preferred at this time, but the variant is not exclusively associated with this time period.

The colonels preferred to call the coup an Ethnosotirios Epanastasis (Εθνοσωτήριος Επανάστασις, 'revolution to save the nation'). Their official justification was that a "communist conspiracy" had infiltrated Greece's bureaucracy, academia, press, and military, to such an extent that drastic action was needed to protect the country from communist takeover. Thus, the defining characteristic of the Junta was its staunch anti-communism. They used the term anarchokommounisté (αναρχοκομμουνισταί, 'anarcho-communist') to describe leftists in general. In a similar vein, the junta attempted to steer Greek public opinion not only by propaganda but also by inventing new words and slogans, such as paleokommatismos (Παλαιοκομματισμός, 'old-partyism') to discredit parliamentary democracy, or Ellas Ellinon Christianon (Ελλάς Ελλήνων Χριστιανών, 'Greece for Christian Greeks') to underscore its ideology. The junta's main ideological spokesmen included Georgios Georgalas and journalist Savvas Konstantopoulos, both former Marxists.

In 1970, Georgalas published a book The Decline of Consumer Society, stating that consumerism had destroyed the Christian spiritual values of the West, leaving Greece as the last solitary outpost of Christian civilisation. In the same book, Georgalas stated the solution to social problems was not as many believed increased employment, but instead "lengthy psycho-therapeutic programmes" which would create "the free man in harmonious co-existence with himself and his fellow beings". The British historian Richard Clogg described the writings of Georgalas and Konstantopoluos as "pretentious verbiage", claiming that they tended to use elaborate and impressive-sounding language to mask the shallowness of their theories. In essence, intellectuals like Georgalas and Konstantopoulos argued that materialism and consumerism were corroding the spiritual strength of the Greek people, and the military regime would "cure" the Greeks by restoring the traditional values of Orthodoxy (Greek Christianity). One of Papadopoulos' first acts after the coup was to change the pension laws to allow the veterans of the Security Battalions to collect pensions.

A central part of the regime's ideology was xenophobia, which presented Greeks as the creators of civilisation with the rest of the world jealous of the debts they owed to Greece. Colonel Ioannis Ladas, the Secretary-general of the Ministry of Public Order, came to international prominence in the summer of 1968 when he personally beat up Panayiotis Lambrias, the editor of magazine Eikones for running an article saying that homosexuality was accepted as normal in ancient Greece. When the BBC's Greek service reported the incident, Ladas gave a rant at a press conference, claiming that the BBC was run by homosexuals, making him into a sort of unofficial spokesman for the regime.

At a subsequent speech before a visiting group of Greek-Americans on 6 August 1968, Ladas quoted Friedrich Nietzsche's statement that the ancient Greeks invented everything and went on to say: "Foreigners confess and acknowledge Greek superiority. Human civilization was wholly fashioned by our race. Even the enemies of Greece recognize that civilization is an exclusively Greek creation". Ladas went on to denounce young men with long hair as "the degenerate phenomenon of hippy-ism", calling hippies "anti-social elements, drug addicts, sex maniacs, thieves, etc. It is only natural that they should be enemies of the army and the ideals which the military way of life serves". Ladas ended his speech by arguing that Greeks for racial reasons were still the world's preeminent people, but had only declined of inadequate leadership, a problem which had been solved by the "revolution" of 21 April 1967. Ladas claimed that Greece under military leadership would be "cured" of its problems and resume its rightful place in the world. Clogg noted that before the coup, Ladas had been associated with the far-right 4th of August Party, and contributed many articles to that party's journal, which was a "racist and anti-Semitic" magazine which glorified not only 4 August Regime, but also the Third Reich.

The Greek novelist Yiorgos Theotokas once coined the term progonoplexia (Προγονοπληξία, 'ancestoritis') to describe an obsession with the heritage of the past, which many felt that Papadopoulos and the rest of the junta suffered from. Papadopoulos often described the Greeks in his speeches as the "elect of God", claiming the regenerated Ellas Ellinon Christianon ('Greece for Christian Greeks') would be the example to the rest of the world as maintained that people all over the world would regard his ideology of "Helleno-Christian civilization" alongside the philosophy of Plato and Aristotle as the summit of intellectual achievement.

The Greek junta has been characterised as neo-fascist. The junta's ultranationalist, militaristic, and deeply anti-communist character has been likened to that of the interwar dictatorship of Ioannis Metaxas, leading to many scholars describing the regime as fascistic.

=== "Patient in a cast" and other metaphors ===
Throughout his tenure as the junta strongman, Papadopoulos often employed what have been described by the BBC as gory medical metaphors, where he or the junta assumed the role of the "medical doctor". The supposed "patient" was Greece. Typically Papadopoulos or the junta portrayed themselves as the doctor who operated on the patient by putting the patient's foot in an orthopaedic cast and applying restraints on the patient, tying him on a surgical bed and putting him under anaesthesia to perform the operation so that the life of the patient would not be endangered during the operation. In one of his famous speeches Papadopoulos mentioned:

We are in front of a patient who we have on a surgical bed, and who, should the surgeon not strap on the surgical bed during the operation and the anesthesia, there is a probability, rather than the surgery granting him the restoration of the health, to lead him to his death. ... The restrictions are the strapping of the patient to the surgical bed so that he will undergo the surgery without danger.

In the same speech Papadopoulos continued:

We have a patient. We have put him in a plaster cast. We are checking him to find out if he can walk without the plaster cast. We break the initial cast, potentially to replace it with a new one, where necessary. The referendum shall become a general overview of the patient's capabilities. Let us pray for him never to need a cast again; and should he need one, we will put it to him. And the one thing I can promise you, is to invite you to witness the foot without a cast!

Other metaphors contained religious imagery related to the resurrection of Christ at Easter: "Χριστός Ανέστη – Ελλάς Ανέστη" ("Christ has risen – Greece has risen"), alluding that the junta would save Greece and resurrect her into a greater, new Land. The theme of rebirth was used many times as a standard reply to avoid answering any questions as to how long the dictatorship would last:

Because the latter is someone else's concern. They are the concerns of those, who lit the fuse of the dynamite for the explosion which led to the rebirth of the State the night of 21 April 1967.

The religious themes and rebirth metaphors are also seen in the following:

Our obligations are described by both our religion and our history. Christ teaches concord and love. Our history demands faith in the Fatherland. ... Hellas is being reborn, Hellas will accomplish great things, Hellas will live forever.

=== Civil rights ===
As soon as the coup d'état was announced over Greek radio, martial music was continuously broadcast over the airwaves. This was interrupted from time to time with announcements of the junta issuing orders, which always started with the introduction, Apofasizomen ke diatassomen (Αποφασίζομεν και διατάσσομεν, 'We decide and we order'). Long-standing political freedoms and civil liberties, that had been taken for granted and enjoyed by the Greek people for decades, were instantly suppressed. Article 14 of the Greek Constitution, which protected freedom of thought and freedom of the press, was immediately and fraudulently suspended. Military courts were established, and political parties were dissolved. Legislation that took decades to fine tune and multiple parliaments to enact was thus erased in a matter of days. The rapid dismantling of Greek democracy had begun.

In fact, the junta crackdown was so fast that by September 1967, Norway, Denmark, Sweden, and the Netherlands went before the European Commission of Human Rights to accuse Greece of violating most of the human rights protected by the European Convention on Human Rights. 6,188 suspected communists and political opponents were imprisoned or exiled to remote Greek islands within the first week after the coup.

Under the junta, torture became a deliberate practice carried out both by the Security Police and the Greek Military Police (ESA), with an estimated 3,500 people detained in torture centres run by ESA. Commonly used methods of torture included, but were not limited to, beating the soles of detainees' feet, sexual torture, choking and ripping out body hair. The Special Interrogation Unit of the Greek Military Police (EAT/ESA) used a combination of techniques that included continuous standing in an empty room, sleep and food deprivation, beatings and loud sounds.

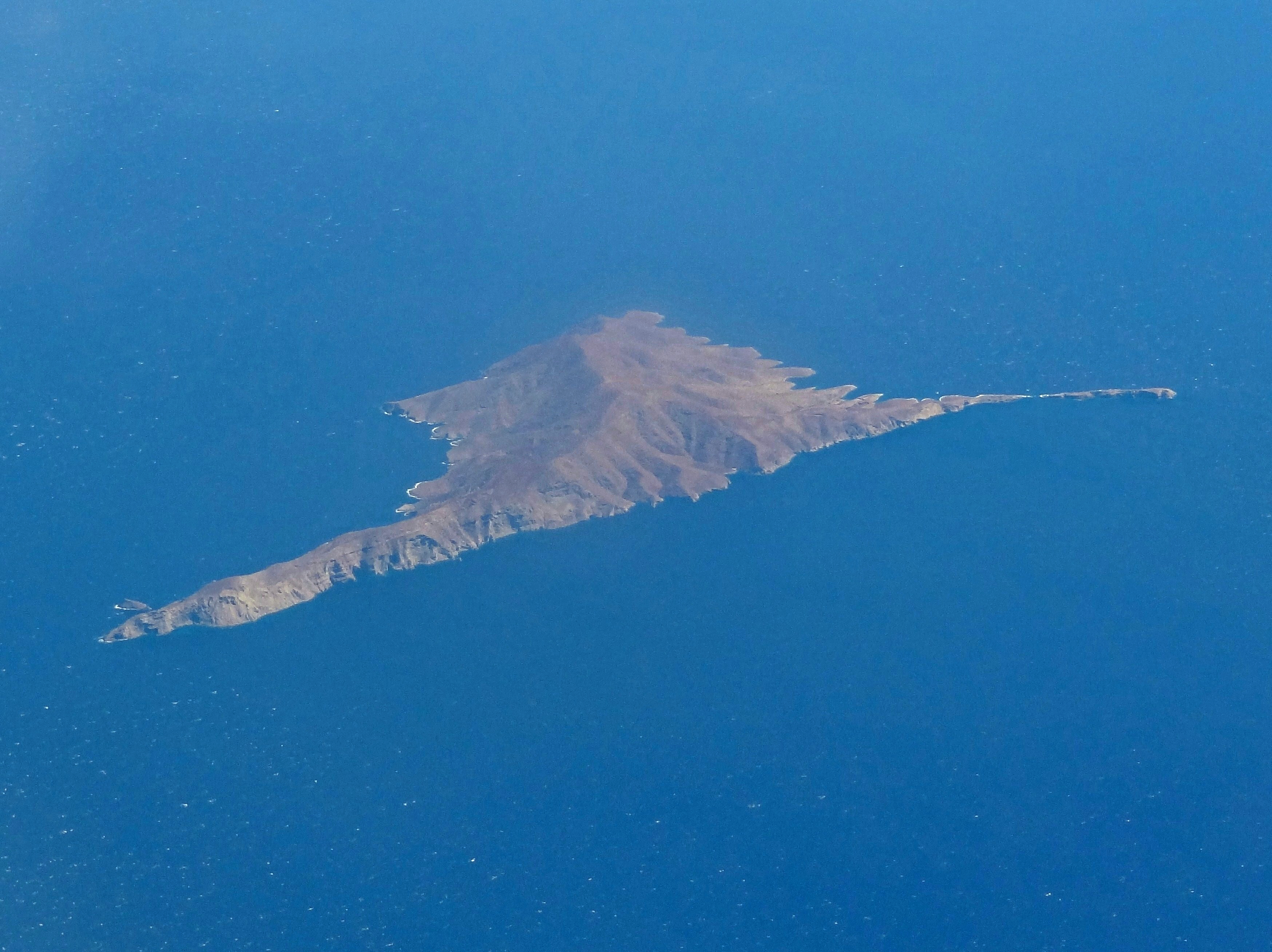
Gyaros, a prison island for dissidents

According to recent research based on new interviews with survivors, in the period from May to November 1973 this combination of interrogation techniques also included the repetition of songs that were popular hits of the time. These were played loudly and repeatedly from loudspeakers. These methods attacked the senses without leaving any visible traces and have been classified since as torture by international organisations.

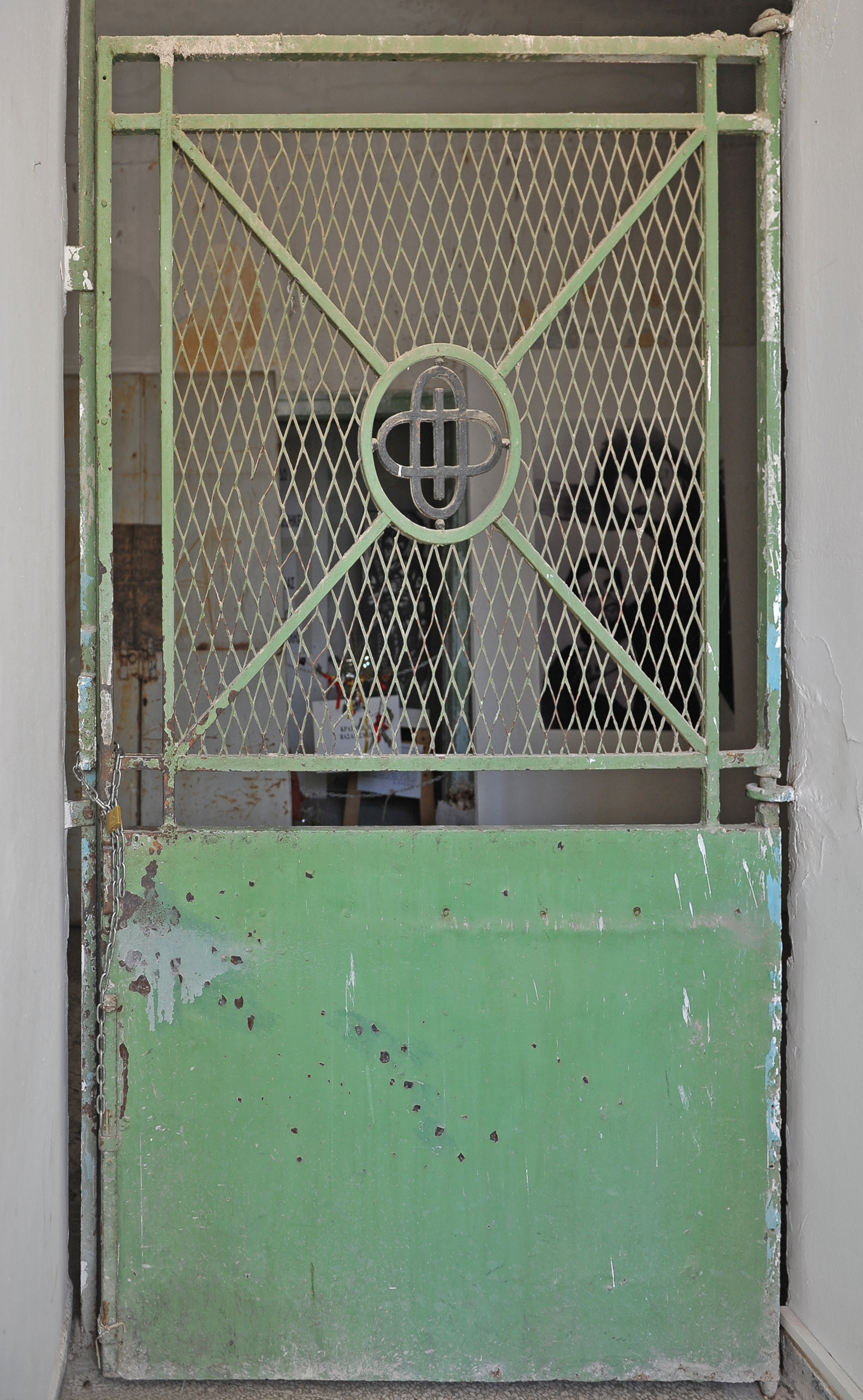
The cell of officer Spyros Moustaklis in EAT-ESA building. During a torture session, he suffered brain trauma and was left paralysed.

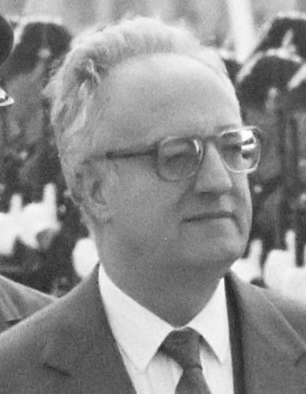
Later President of Greece, Magistrate Christos Sartzetakis was discharged and imprisoned by the junta due to his investigation on Lambrakis' murder.

According to a human rights report by Amnesty International, in the first month of the 21 April coup an estimated 8,000 people were arrested. James Becket, an American attorney and author of Barbarism in Greece, was sent to Greece by Amnesty International. He wrote in December 1969 that "a conservative estimate would place at not less than two thousand" the number of people tortured.

The right of assembly was revoked and no political demonstrations were allowed. Surveillance on citizens was a fact of life, even during permitted social activities. That had a continuously chilling effect on the population who realised that, even though they were allowed certain social activities, they could not overstep the boundaries and delve into or discuss forbidden subjects. This realisation, including the absence of any civil rights as well as maltreatment during police arrest, ranging from threats to beatings or worse, made life under the junta a difficult proposition for many ordinary citizens. Photography by ordinary citizens was banned in public locations.

The junta allowed citizens to participate in ordinary societal events such as rock concerts. However, citizens lived in extreme fear, as any behaviour that the junta disapproved of, coupled with the complete absence of any civil rights or freedoms, could easily result in torture, beatings, exile or imprisonment, and the labelling of the victims as anarcho-communists. The absence of a valid code of jurisprudence led to the unequal application of the law among the citizens and to rampant favouritism and nepotism. Absence of elected representation meant that the citizens' stark and only choice was to submit to these arbitrary measures exactly as dictated by the junta. The country had become a true police state. Thousands were jailed for political reasons by the dictatorship and thousands were forced into exile. More than 10,000 were estimated to have been arrested in the first few days after the coup.

Complete lack of press freedom coupled with nonexistent civil rights meant that continuous cases of civil rights abuses could neither be reported nor investigated by an independent press or any other reputable authority. This led to a psychology of fear among the citizens during the Papadopoulos dictatorship, which became worse under Ioannidis.

=== External relations ===
The military government was given support by the United States as a Cold War ally, due to its proximity to the Eastern European Soviet bloc, and the fact that the previous Truman administration had given the country millions of dollars in economic aid to discourage communism. U.S. support for the junta, which was staunchly anti-communist, is claimed to be the cause of rising anti-Americanism in Greece during and following the junta's undemocratic rule.

Though all NATO members except for Portugal, then under the authoritarian Estado Novo regime, despised the Regime of the Colonels, there was a mixed response to the junta from Western Europe. The Scandinavian countries and the Netherlands filed a complaint before the Human Rights Commission of the Council of Europe in September 1967. The Commission on Human Rights took the exceptional step of constituting a Sub-Commission to investigate the accusations of gross human rights abuses. The sub-commission reported its extensive on-site investigation and unearthed significant evidence of torture and human rights violations. Greece however opted to leave the Council of Europe in December 1969 before a full verdict of the commission could be handed down.

Countries such as the United Kingdom and West Germany on the other hand were voicing criticism about Greece's human rights record but supported the country's continued membership in the Council of Europe and NATO because of the country's strategic value for the western alliance.

Unusually, in spite of the anti-communism of the Regime of the Colonels, it developed better relations with the Socialist Republic of Romania, ruled by the similarly brutal and despotic Nicolae Ceaușescu. Ceaușescu's rationale for seeking good working relations with the Greek junta stemmed from a mutual desire to maintain stability in the Balkans and due to the shared dictatorial characters of the two regimes.

=== Sociocultural policies ===
To gain support for his rule, Papadopoulos projected an image that appealed to some key segments of Greek society. The son of a poor but educated rural family, he was educated at the prestigious Hellenic Military Academy. Papadopoulos allowed substantial social and cultural freedoms to all social classes, but political oppression and censorship were at times heavy-handed, especially in areas deemed sensitive by the junta, such as political activities, and politically related art, literature, film and music. Costa-Gavras's film Z and Mikis Theodorakis's music, among others, were never allowed even during the most relaxed times of the dictatorship, and an index of prohibited songs, literature and art was kept.

==== Western music and film ====
Remarkably, after some initial hesitation and as long as they were not deemed to be politically damaging to the junta, junta censors allowed wide access to Western music and films. Even the then-racy West German film Helga, a 1967 sex education documentary featuring a live birth scene, had no trouble making its debut in Greece just like in any other Western country. Moreover, the film was only restricted for those under 13 years of age. In 1971 Robert Hartford-Davis was allowed by the junta to film the classic horror film Incense for the Damned, starring Peter Cushing and Patrick Macnee and suitably featuring Chryseis (Χρυσηίς), a beguiling Greek siren with vampire tendencies, on the Greek island of Hydra. In 1970 the film Woodstock was shown all over Greece, with reports of arrests and disturbances especially in Athens as many youths flocked to see the film and filled theatres to capacity, while many others were left outside. Films such as Marijuana Stop! dealt with the hippie culture and its perception in Greek society as drug-using.

Meanwhile, at Matala, Crete, a hippie colony which had been living in the caves since the 1960s was never disturbed. Singer-songwriter Joni Mitchell was inspired to write the song "Carey" after staying in the Matala caves with the hippie community in 1971. Hippie colonies also existed in other popular tourist spots such as "Paradise Beach" in Mykonos.

==== Greek folk music ====
During its rule, the dictatorship heavily utilised folk music in mass media in order to help solidify the relationship between the junta and Greek national identity, in turn legitimising its rule over the country. The regime sponsored song contests and concerts featuring folk musicians throughout its existence. The favoured types of music employed by the government were those which accompanied the Kalamatianos and Tsamiko folk dances. Additionally, the regime encouraged the production of new folk songs with lyrics praising the government and its leaders, like Georgios Papadopoulos. Because the clarinet was so strongly featured in the music of the junta, it remains associated with the Colonels by many Greeks today. The ideology behind the promotion of folk music was twofold: to bridge the gap of continuity with Greece's past and present, and to limit foreign cultural influences such as psychedelic music (which could hold political connotations contrary to those of the junta) by substituting them with traditionally Greek ones. Folk music was also used as an ideological weapon against dissidents, and it was played constantly in detention centres to help break prisoners.

==== Greek rock ====
In the early days of the dictatorship, Western music broadcasts were limited from the airwaves in favour of martial music, but this was eventually relaxed. In addition, pop/rock music programmes such as the one hosted by famous Greek music/radio/television personality and promoter Nico Mastorakis were very popular throughout the dictatorship years both on radio and television. Most Western record sales were similarly not restricted. In fact, even rock concerts and tours were allowed such as by the then popular rock groups Socrates Drank the Conium and Nostradamos.

Another pop group, Poll, was a pioneer of Greek pop music in the early 1970s. Its lead singer and composer was Robert Williams, who was later joined, in 1971, by Kostas Tournas. Poll enjoyed a number of nationwide hits, such as "Anthrope Agapa (Mankind Love One Another)", an anti-war song composed by Tournas, and "Ela Ilie Mou (Come, My Sun)", composed by Tournas, Williams. Tournas later pursued a solo career and in 1972 produced the progressive psychedelic hit solo album Aperanta Chorafia (Απέραντα Χωράφια, 'Infinite Fields'). He wrote and arranged the album using an orchestra and a rock group ("Ruth") combination, producing a rock opera which is considered a landmark of Greek rock. In 1973 Kostas Tournas created the album Astroneira (Stardreams), influenced by David Bowie's Ziggy Stardust.

Songwriter Dionysis Savvopoulos, who was initially imprisoned by the regime, nevertheless rose to great popularity and produced a number of influential and highly politically allegorical, especially against the junta, albums during the period, including To Perivoli tou Trellou (Το Περιβόλι του Τρελλού, 'The Madman's Orchard'), Ballos (Μπάλλος, the name of Greek folk dance) and Vromiko Psomi (Βρώμικο Ψωμί, 'Dirty Bread').

==== Tourism ====
Concurrently, tourism was actively encouraged by Papadopoulos' government and, funding scandals notwithstanding, there was great development of the tourist sector. With tourism came nightlife. However, under Papadopoulos, in the absence of any civil rights these sociocultural freedoms existed in a legal vacuum that meant they were not guaranteed, but rather dispensed at the whim of the junta. In addition any transgressing into political matters during social or cultural activities usually meant arrest and punishment. Tourism was furthered by the 1969 European Championships in Athletics in Athens which showed political normality. Even the boycott of the West German team was not directed against the junta, but against its own team leadership. Although discos and nightclubs were, initially, subjected to a curfew, partially due to an energy crisis, this was eventually extended from 1:00 a.m. to 3:00 a.m. as the energy crisis eased. These freedoms were later reversed by Dimitrios Ioannidis after his coup.

==== Agriculture ====
The farmers were Papadopoulos's natural constituency and were more likely to support him, seeing him as one of their own because of his rural roots. He cultivated this relationship by appealing to them, calling them i rahokokalia tou laou (η ραχοκοκαλιά του λαού, 'the backbone of the people') and cancelling all agricultural loans. By further insisting on promoting, but not really enforcing for fear of middle-class backlash, religion and patriotism, he further appealed to the simpler ideals of rural Greece and strengthened his image as people's champion among farmers, who tended to ridicule the middle class. Furthermore, the regime promoted a policy of economic development in rural areas, which were mostly neglected by the previous governments, that had focused largely on urban industrial development.

==== Urban classes ====
While never strongly supported by the urban middle class, they at first generally accepted Papadopoulos's rule (albeit reluctantly). Bourgeois Greeks acquiesced to the junta with the understanding that the dictatorship would be temporary and that the colonels would hold free elections upon the restoration of order. In addition, the Greek business community largely approved of the regime's economic policies, especially its promotion of tourism.

==== Greek language ====
On the Greek language question of whether Greece should adopt Katharevousa, based on Ancient Greek, or Demotic Greek, based on the vernacular actually spoken by most Greeks, the junta came firmly down on the side of Katharevousa. In 1968, Katharevousa was made the official language of the state, including education; Demotic was banned from schools except for the first three years of primary classes, and even there the Demotic used was altered to make it as much like Katharevousa as possible. Katharevousa became so closely identified with the junta that its eventual downfall settled the question once and for all in favour of Demotic.

=== Economic policies ===
The 1967–1973 period was marked by high rates of economic growth coupled with low inflation and low unemployment. Economic growth was driven by investment in the tourism industry, loose emigration policies, public spending, and pro-business incentives that fostered both domestic and foreign capital spending. Several international companies invested in Greece at the time, including The Coca-Cola Company. Economic growth started losing steam by 1972.

In addition, large scale construction of hydroelectric dam projects, such as in Aliakmon, Kastrakion, Polyphytos, the expansion of thermoelectric generation units and other significant infrastructure development, took place. The junta used to proudly announce these projects with the slogan: I Ellas ine ena ergotaxion (Η Ελλάς είναι ένα εργοτάξιον, 'Greece is a construction zone'). The always smiling Stylianos Pattakos, also known as to proto mistri tis elladas (Το πρώτο μυστρί της Ελλάδας, 'the first trowel of Greece'), since he frequently appeared at project inaugurations with a trowel in hand, starred in many of the Epikaira propaganda documentaries that were screened before feature film presentation in Greek cinemas.

Economists have criticised the waste, fraud, and abuse derived from the junta's economic policies. One notable example is tourism minister Ioannis Ladas' practice of granting ill-advised loans to would be hoteliers in order to promote the tourism industry. This fostered the erection of a multitude of hotels, sometimes in non-tourist areas, and with no underlying business rationale. Several such hotels were abandoned unfinished as soon as the loans were secured, and their remains still dot the Greek countryside. These questionable loans are referred to as Thalassodania (Θαλασσοδάνεια, 'loans of the sea'), to indicate the loose terms under which they were granted.

Another contested policy of the regime was the writing-off of agricultural loans, up to a value of 100,000 drachmas, to farmers. This has been attributed to an attempt by Papadopoulos to gain public support for his regime.

=== Italian connection ===
At the time, the Italian far right was very impressed with the methods of Papadopoulos and his junta. In April 1968, Papadopoulos invited fifty members of the Italian far right on a Greek tour, to demonstrate the junta's methods. Invitees included Stefano Delle Chiaie and members of Ordine Nuovo, Avanguardia Nazionale, Europa Civiltà, and FUAN-La Caravella. (cf Frattini, Entity, 2004, p. 304) The Italians were impressed. Upon returning to their country, they escalated their political violence, embarking on a terror campaign of bombings and other violence which killed and injured hundreds. Afterwards, the right-wing instigators of this violence blamed the communists.

After their visit to Greece, the Italian neo-fascists also engaged in false flag operations and embarked on a campaign of infiltration of leftist, anarchist, and Marxist–Leninist organisations. One of the neo-fascists conducted frequent provocations and infiltrations that have been suggested were connected to the Piazza Fontana bombing on 12 December 1969, although no hard proof has ever been uncovered to link the actions. The Greek junta was so impressed with the manner in which their Italian counterparts were paving the way toward an Italian coup d'état that, on 15 May 1969, Papadopoulos sent them a congratulatory message stating that "His Excellency the Prime Minister notes that the efforts that have been undertaken by the Greek National government in Italy for some time start to have some impact".

== Anti-junta movement ==
The entire left wing of the Greek political spectrum, including the long outlawed Communist Party of Greece, opposed the junta from the start. Many new militant groups formed in 1968, both in exile and in Greece, to promote democratic rule. These included Panhellenic Liberation Movement, Democratic Defense, and the Socialist Democratic Union. Sylva Akrita, a politician and vocal opponent of military rule, became one of the first Greek women to be arrested and imprisoned by the new military authorities. Akrita was sentenced to ten years in prison by a military court for her political activities against the junta.

The first armed action against the junta was Alexandros Panagoulis's failed attempt to assassinate George Papadopoulos, on 13 August 1968.

=== Assassination attempt by Panagoulis ===
The assassination attempt took place on the morning of 13 August, when Papadopoulos went from his summer residence in Lagonisi to Athens, escorted by his personal security motorcycles and cars. Alexandros Panagoulis ignited a bomb at a point of the coastal road where the limousine carrying Papadopoulos had to slow down, but the bomb failed to harm Papadopoulos. Panagoulis was captured a few hours later in a nearby sea cave, as the boat that would let him escape the scene of the attack had not shown up.

Panagoulis was transferred to the Greek Military Police (EAT-ESA) offices, where he was questioned, beaten, and tortured (see the proceedings of Theofiloyiannakos's trial). On 17 November 1968, he was sentenced to death. He remained in prison for five years. After democracy was restored, Panagoulis was elected into Parliament. He is regarded as emblematic of the struggle to restore democracy.

=== Broadening of the movement ===
The funeral of George Papandreou, Sr., on 3 November 1968, spontaneously turned into a massive demonstration against the junta. Thousands of Athenians disobeyed the military's orders, and followed the casket to the cemetery. The junta arrested 41 people.

On 28 March 1969, after two years of widespread censorship, political detentions and torture, Giorgos Seferis, recipient of the Nobel Prize for Literature in 1963, took a stand against the junta. He made a statement on the BBC World Service, with copies simultaneously distributed to every newspaper in Athens. Attacking the colonels, he passionately demanded that "This anomaly must end". Seferis died before the junta ended. His funeral, on 20 September 1972, turned into a massive demonstration against the military government.

Also in 1969, Costa-Gavras released the film Z, based on a book by celebrated left-wing writer Vassilis Vassilikos. The film, banned in Greece, presented a lightly fictionalised account of the events surrounding the assassination of United Democratic Left MP Gregoris Lambrakis in 1963. The film captured the sense of outrage about the junta. The soundtrack of the film was written by Mikis Theodorakis, who was imprisoned by the junta and later went into exile, and the music was smuggled into the country and added to other inspirational, underground Theodorakis tracks.

A lesser known Danish film, in Greek, Your Neighbor's Son, detailed the subordination and training of simple youths to become torturers for the junta.

=== International protest ===
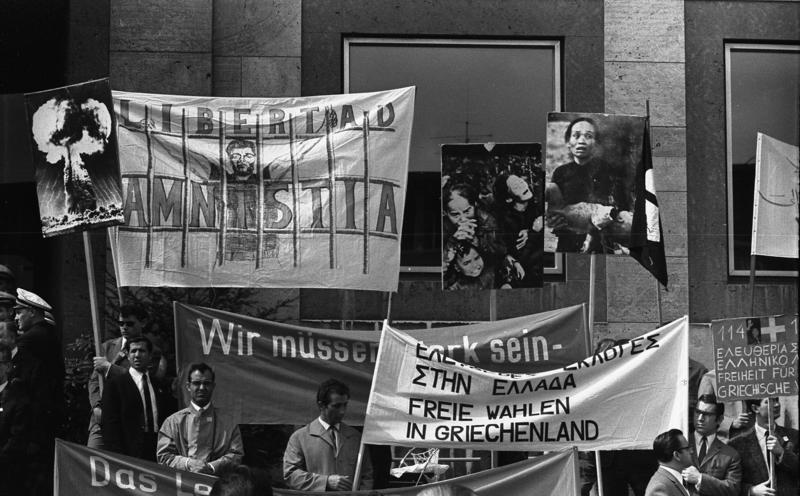
Protest against the junta by Greek political exiles in Germany, 1967

The junta exiled thousands, on the grounds that they were communists and/or "enemies of the country". Most of them were subjected to internal exile on Greek deserted islands, such as Makronisos, Gyaros, Gioura, or inhabited islands such as Leros, Agios Eustratios or Trikeri. The most famous were in external exile, most of whom were substantially involved in the resistance, organising protests in European capital cities or helping and hiding refugees from Greece.

These included: Melina Mercouri, actor, singer (and, after 1981 Minister for Culture); Mikis Theodorakis, composer of resistance songs; Costas Simitis (prime minister from 1996 to 2004); Andreas Papandreou (prime minister from 1981 to 1989 and again from 1993 to 1996); and Lady Amalia Fleming (wife of Sir Alexander Fleming, philanthropist, political activist). Some chose exile, unable to stand life under the junta. For example, Melina Mercouri was allowed to enter Greece, but stayed away on her own accord.

In the early hours of 19 September 1970, in Matteotti square in Genoa, geology student Kostas Georgakis set himself ablaze in protest against the dictatorship of George Papadopoulos. The junta delayed the arrival of his remains to Corfu for four months, fearing public reaction and protests. At the time, his death caused a sensation in Greece and abroad, as it was the first tangible manifestation of the depth of resistance against the junta. He is the only known anti-junta resistance activist to have sacrificed himself. He is considered the precursor of later student protest, such as the Athens Polytechnic uprising. The Municipality of Corfu dedicated a memorial in his honour, near his home in Corfu city.

In a speech before the U.S. Senate on 6 November 1971, Senator Lee Metcalf listed the members of the Greek junta who had served in the collaborationist Security Battalions and denounced the presidency of Richard Nixon for supporting what he called a "junta of Nazi collaborators". The German writer, investigative reporter and journalist Günter Wallraff traveled to Greece in May 1974. While in Syntagma Square, he protested against human right violations. He was arrested and tortured by the police, as he did not carry, on purpose, any papers on him that could identify him as a foreigner. After his identity was revealed, Wallraff was convicted and sentenced to 14 months in jail. He was released in August, after the end of the dictatorship.

=== Velos mutiny ===
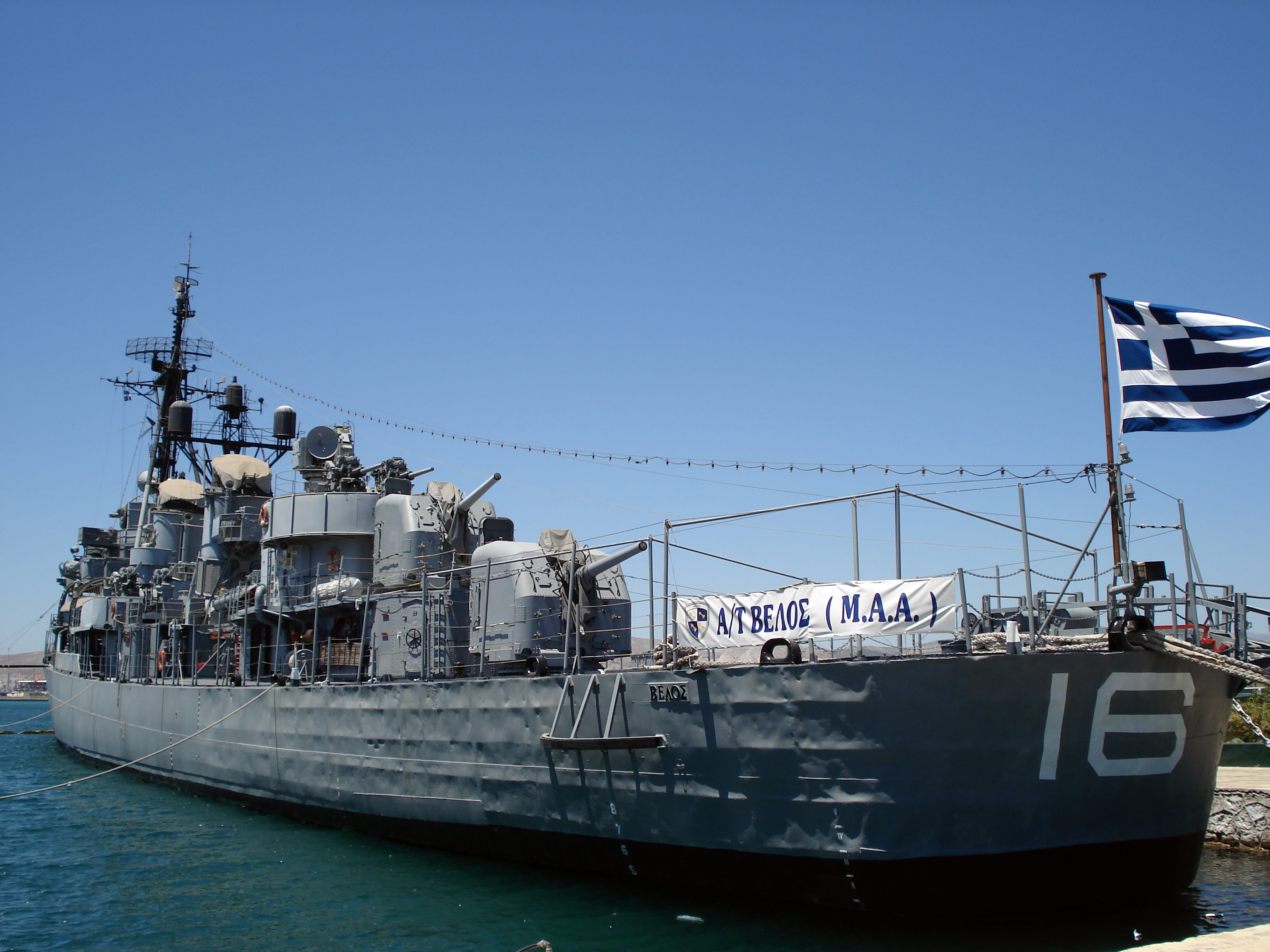
The destroyer Velos (Βέλος, 'Arrow'), now a museum ship at Palaio Faliro in Athens

In an anti-junta protest, on 23 May 1973, HNS Velos, under the command of Commander Nikolaos Pappas, refused to return to Greece after participating in a NATO exercise and remained anchored at Fiumicino, Italy. During a patrol with other NATO vessels between continental Italy and Sardinia, the commander and the officers heard over the radio that a number of fellow naval officers had been arrested in Greece. Commander Pappas was involved in a group of democratic officers who remained loyal to their oath to obey the Constitution and planned to act against the junta. Evangelos Averoff also participated in the Velos mutiny, for which he was later arrested as an "instigator".

Pappas believed that since his fellow anti-junta officers had been arrested, there was no more hope for a movement inside Greece. He therefore decided to act alone in order to motivate global public opinion. He mustered all the crew to the stern and announced his decision, which was received with enthusiasm by the crew.

Pappas signalled his intentions to the squadron commander and NATO headquarters, quoting the preamble of the North Atlantic Treaty, which declares that "all governments ... are determined to safeguard the freedom, common heritage and civilisation of their peoples, founded on the principles of democracy, individual liberty and the rule of law", and, leaving formation, sailed for Rome. There, anchored about 3.5 nautical miles (6 km) away from the coast of Fiumicino, three ensigns sailed ashore with a whaleboat, went to Fiumicino Airport and telephoned the international press agencies, notifying them of the situation in Greece, the presence of the destroyer, and that the captain would hold a press conference the next day.

This action increased international interest in the situation in Greece. The commander, six officers, and twenty five petty officers requested permission to remain abroad as political refugees. Indeed, the whole crew wished to follow their commander but were advised by its officers to remain onboard and return to Greece to inform families and friends about what happened. Velos returned to Greece after a month with a replacement crew. After the fall of the junta all officers and petty officers returned to the Navy.

=== Normalisation and attempts at liberalisation ===
The collapse of the junta both ideologically and politically was triggered by a series of events which unfolded soon after Papadopoulos' attempt at liberalisation, with ideological collapse preceding its eventual political collapse. During and following this ill-fated process the internal political strains of the junta came to the fore and pitted the junta factions against each other, thus destroying the seemingly monolithic cohesion of the dictatorship.

This had the effect of seriously weakening the coherence of the political message and, consequently, the regime's credibility. Later events showed that this was a fatal blow, from which the junta never recovered. At the same time, during Papadopoulos' attempt at liberalisation, some of the junta constraints were removed from Greece's body politic. This led to demands for more freedoms, and political unrest, in a society well used to democratic action prior to the dictatorship.

Presidential standard (1973–74)

Despite his heavy-handed approach to dissent, Papadopoulos had indicated as early as 1968 that he was eager for a reform process. He had declared at the time that he did not want the "Revolution" (junta speak for the "dictatorship") to become a "regime". He attempted to initiate reforms in 1969 and 1970 but was thwarted by the hardline members of the junta, including Ioannidis. Subsequent to his 1970 failed attempt at reform, he threatened to resign. He was dissuaded when the hardliners renewed their personal allegiance to him. There was a significant divide in the junta between those like Papadoupolos who identified with the legacy of Eleftherios Venizelos and hardliners who identified with Ioannis Metaxas.

On 10 April 1970 Papadopoulos announced the formation of the Simvouleftiki Epitropi (Συμβουλευτική Επιτροπή, "Advisory Council") otherwise known as "Papadopoulos' Parliament". Composed of members elected through an electoral type process but limited only to ethnikofrones (Εθνικόφρων, 'regime supporters'), it was bicameral, composed of the Central Advisory Council and the Provincial Advisory Council. The Central Council met in Athens in the Parliament Building. Both councils had the purpose to advise the dictator. At the time of the announcement of the formation of the council, Papadopoulos explained that he wanted to avoid using the term Vouli (Βουλή, 'Parliament') for the Committee because it sounded bad.

The council was dissolved just prior to Papadopoulos' failed attempt to liberalise his regime. As internal dissatisfaction grew in the early 1970s, and especially after an abortive coup by the Navy in early 1973, Papadopoulos attempted to legitimise the regime by beginning a gradual "democratization" (See also the article on Metapolitefsi).

On 1 June 1973, he abolished the monarchy and declared Greece a republic with himself as president. He was confirmed in office after a controversial referendum, the results of which were not recognised by the political parties. He furthermore sought the support of the old political establishment, but secured only the cooperation of Spiros Markezinis, who was appointed prime minister. Concurrently, many restrictions were lifted, and the army's role significantly reduced. Papadopoulos intended to establish a presidential republic, with extensive–and within the context of the system, almost dictatorial–powers vested in the presidency. The decision to return to political rule and the restriction of the military's role was resented by many of the regime's supporters in the Army, whose dissatisfaction with Papadopoulos would become evident a few months later.

== Uprising at the Athens Polytechnic ==
Papadopoulos' heavy-handed attempt at liberalisation did not find favour among many in Greece. The stilted democratisation process he proposed was constrained by multiple factors. His inexperience at carrying out an unprecedented political experiment of democratisation was burdened by his tendency to concentrate as much power in his hands as possible, a weakness he exhibited during the junta years when he would sometimes hold multiple high-echelon government portfolios. This especially antagonised the intelligentsia, whose primary exponents were the students. The students at the Law School in Athens, for example, demonstrated multiple times against the dictatorship prior to the events at the Polytechneion.

The tradition of student protest was always strong in Greece, even before the dictatorship. Papadopoulos tried hard to suppress and discredit the student movement during his tenure at the helm of the junta. But the liberalisation process he undertook allowed the students to organise more freely, and this gave the opportunity to the students at the National Technical University of Athens to organise a demonstration that grew progressively larger and more effective. The political momentum was on the side of the students. Sensing this, the junta panicked and reacted violently.

In the early hours of Saturday, 17 November 1973, Papadopoulos sent the army to suppress the student strike and sit-in of the Eleftheri Poliorkimeni (Ελεύθεροι Πολιορκημένοι, 'Free Besieged'), as the students called themselves, at the Athens Polytechnic which had commenced on 14 November. Shortly after 3:00 am. EET, under almost complete cover of darkness, an AMX 30 tank crashed through the rail gate of the Athens Polytechnic with subsequent loss of life. An estimated 24 people were killed. The army also occupied Syntagma Square for at least the following day. Even the sidewalk cafes were closed.

Ioannidis' involvement in inciting unit commanders to commit criminal acts during the uprising, so that he could facilitate his own upcoming coup, was noted in the indictment presented to the court by the prosecutor during the Greek junta trials, and in his subsequent conviction in the Polytechneion trial where he was found to have been morally responsible for the events.

== Ioannidis coup and regime ==
Ioannidis coup and regime
Date	25 November 1973
Location	Athens, Greece
Result	Coup successful: Georgios Papadopoulos overthrown and put under house arrest.; Dimitrios Ioannidis assumes power.; Coup reverses attempts to liberalise the military junta.

Belligerents
Hardliner faction: Army dissidents	Government

Commanders and leaders
Dimitrios Ioannidis; Phaedon Gizikis	Georgios Papadopoulos; Spyros Markezinis

The uprising triggered a series of events that put an abrupt end to Papadopoulos' attempts at "liberalisation".

Brigadier Dimitrios Ioannidis, a disgruntled junta hardliner and long-time protégé of Papadopoulos as head of the feared Military Police, used the uprising as a pretext to reestablish public order, and staged a counter-coup that overthrew Papadopoulos and Spyros Markezinis on 25 November. Military law was reinstated, and the new junta appointed General Phaedon Gizikis as president and economist Adamantios Androutsopoulos as prime minister, although Ioannidis remained the behind-the-scenes strongman.

Ioannidis's heavy-handed and opportunistic intervention had the effect of destroying the myth that the junta was an idealistic group of army officers with exactly the same ideals who came to save Greece by using their collective wisdom. The main tenet of the junta ideology (and mythology) was gone and so was the collective. By default, he remained the only man at the top after toppling the other three principals of the junta. Characteristically, he cited ideological reasons for ousting the Papadopoulos faction, accusing them with straying from the principles of the Revolution, especially of being corrupt and misusing their privileges as army officers for financial gains.

Papadopoulos and his junta always claimed that the 21 April 1967 "revolution" saved Greece from the old party system. Now Ioannidis was, in effect, claiming that his coup saved the revolution from the Papadopoulos faction. The dysfunction as well as the ideological fragmentation and fractionalisation of the junta was finally out in the open. Ioannidis, however, did not make these accusations personally as he always tried to avoid unnecessary publicity. The radio broadcasts, following the now familiar "coup in progress" scenario featuring martial music interspersed with military orders and curfew announcements, kept repeating that the army was taking back the reins of power in order to save the principles of the revolution and that the overthrow of the Papadopoulos-Markezinis government was supported by the army, navy and air force.

At the same time they announced that the new coup was a "continuation of the revolution of 1967" and accused Papadopoulos with "straying from the ideals of the 1967 revolution" and "pushing the country towards parliamentary rule too quickly".

Prior to seizing power, Ioannidis preferred to work in the background and he never held any formal office in the junta. He was now the de facto leader of a regime composed by members some of whom were rounded up by Greek Military Police (ESA) soldiers in roving jeeps to serve and others that were simply chosen by mistake. The Ioannidis method of forming a government dealt yet another blow to the rapidly diminishing credibility of the regime both at home and abroad.

The new junta, despite its rather inauspicious origins, pursued an aggressive internal crackdown and an expansionist foreign policy.

== Cypriot coup d'état, Turkish invasion of Cyprus and fall of the junta ==
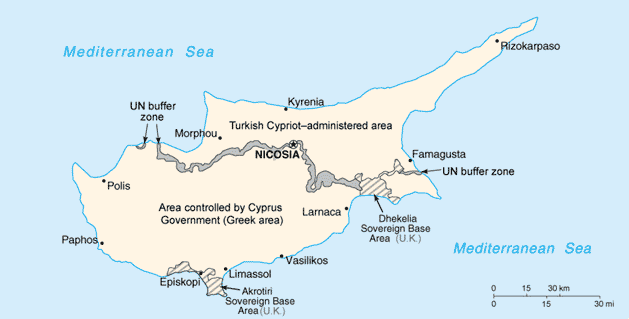
Map showing the division of Cyprus

Sponsored by Ioannidis, on 15 July 1974 a coup d'état on the island of Cyprus overthrew Archbishop Makarios III, the Cypriot President. Turkey replied to this by invading Cyprus and occupying the northern part of the island, after heavy fighting with the Cypriot and Greek ELDYK Forces (ΕΛ.ΔΥ.Κ. (Ελληνική Δύναμη Κύπρου), "Greek Force for Cyprus"). During a military council, Ioannidis is reported to have said angrily to the American minister Joseph J. Sisco (who was present) "You betrayed us! You had assured us that you would prevent any Turkish landing".

There was a well-founded fear that an all-out war with Turkey was imminent. The Cyprus fiasco led to senior Greek military officers withdrawing their support for junta strongman Brigadier Dimitrios Ioannidis. Junta-appointed President Phaedon Gizikis called a meeting of old-guard politicians, including Panagiotis Kanellopoulos, Spiros Markezinis, Stephanos Stephanopoulos, Evangelos Averoff, and others.

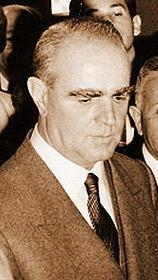
Konstantinos Karamanlis led the country's transition to democracy, the establishment of the Third Hellenic Republic, the trial of the junta leaders, and the purge of the Army of its members.

The agenda was to appoint a national unity government that would lead the country to elections. Although former prime minister Panagiotis Kanellopoulos was originally backed, on 23 July, Gizikis finally invited former prime minister Konstantinos Karamanlis, who had resided in Paris since 1963, to assume the role. Karamanlis returned to Athens on a French Presidency Learjet made available to him by President Valéry Giscard d'Estaing, a close personal friend, and was sworn in as prime minister under President Gizikis. Karamanlis' new party, New Democracy, won the November 1974 general election, and he became prime minister.

Parliamentary democracy was thus restored and the Greek legislative elections of 1974 were the first free elections held in a decade. A referendum held 8 December 1974 rejected re-establishment of the monarchy by a 2-to-1 margin, and Greece became a republic.

== Trials of the junta (1975) ==
In January 1975 the junta members were arrested and in early August of the same year the government of Konstantinos Karamanlis brought charges of high treason and insurrection against Georgios Papadopoulos and nineteen other co-conspirators of the military junta. The mass trial was staged at the Korydallos Prison. The trial was described as "Greece's Nuremberg". One thousand soldiers armed with submachine guns provided security. The roads leading to the jail were patrolled by tanks.

Members of the junta on trial. Front row (from left): Papadopoulos, Makarezos, and Pattakos. Ioannidis can be seen on the second row, just behind Pattakos.

Papadopoulos, Pattakos, Makarezos and Ioannidis were sentenced to death for high treason. These sentences were later commuted to life imprisonment by the Karamanlis government for humanitarian reasons. A plan to grant amnesty to the junta principals by the Konstantinos Mitsotakis government in 1990 was cancelled after protests from conservatives, socialists and communists.

Papadopoulos died in the hospital in 1999 after being transferred from Korydallos while Ioannidis remained incarcerated until his death in 2010. This trial was followed by a second trial which centred on the events and the murders during the Athens Polytechnic uprising and a third called "The trial of the torturers".

== Legacy and Greek public opinion ==
The historical repercussions of the junta were profound and are still felt to this day in Greece. Internally the absence of civil rights and the oppression that followed created a sense of fear and persecution among many in the population creating trauma and division that persisted long after the fall of the junta. The Cyprus debacle created a tragedy that is still unfolding.

While the Cyprus fiasco was due to the actions of Ioannidis, it was Papadopoulos who started the cycle of coups. Externally, the absence of human rights in a country belonging to the Western Bloc during the Cold War was a continuous source of embarrassment for the free world, and this and other reasons made Greece an international pariah abroad and interrupted its process of integration with the European Union with incalculable opportunity costs.

The 21 April regime remains highly controversial to this day, with most Greeks holding very strong and polarised views in regards to it. According to a survey by Kapa Research published in the centre-left newspaper To Vima in 2002, the majority of the electoral body (54.7%) consider the regime to have been bad or harmful for Greece while 20.7% consider it to have been good for Greece and 19.8% believe that it was neither good nor harmful. In April 2013, the Metron Analysis Poll, found that 30% of Greeks yearned for the "better" days of the Junta.

The experiences in Greece were formative for several CIA officers, including Clair George and Gust Avrakotos. Avrakotos, for example, dealt with the aftermath when Revolutionary Organization 17 November murdered his superior, CIA station chief Richard Welch, in 1975. Many of his junta-connected associates were also assassinated in this time period. Avrakotos himself had his cover blown by the media and his life became endangered. In 1999, U.S. President Bill Clinton apologised on the behalf of the U.S. government for supporting the military junta in the name of Cold War tactics.

There has been speculation that lingering social effects of the junta played a role in the rise of Golden Dawn, an extreme right-wing party which gained eighteen seats in parliament in two successive elections in 2012, in the midst of Greece's ongoing debt crisis. Golden Dawn's leader, Nikolaos Michaloliakos, met the leaders of the junta while in prison and was inspired to lay the foundations for the party. Some have linked alleged support of Golden Dawn by Hellenic Police officers to the party's statements sympathising with the junta, which commentators note would appeal to policemen whose livelihoods are threatened by harsh austerity measures.

== See also ==
- History of modern Greece and timeline of modern Greek history
- A Man, book by Oriana Fallaci about Alexandros Panagoulis, a would-be assassin and resistance fighter.
- "Imaste dio", a song by Mikis Theodorakis
- Your Neighbor's Son, a 1976 Danish docudrama about the making of the junta torturers
- Loafing and Camouflage, a 1984 Greek film.
- White Terror (Greece)
- Greek Civil War and percentages agreement

== Bibliography ==
- Woodhouse, Christopher M. (1998). Modern Greece: a Short History (5th ed.). London: Faber & Faber. ISBN 978-0-571-19794-1.
- Woodhouse, Christopher M. (1985). The Rise and Fall of the Greek Colonels. London: Granada. ISBN 978-0-246-12469-2.
- Naupliōtēs, Alexandros (2012). Britain and the Greek Colonels: Accommodating the Junta in the Cold War. London: I.B. Tauris. ISBN 978-1-84885-952-4.
