= Kastri, Attica =

City quarter in Nea Erythraia in Athens, Greece

Coordinates: 38°05′39″N 23°49′31″E

Kastri (Attica) is a city quarter in Nea Erythraia in Athens, Greece. Formerly part of Kifisia, it became part of Nea Erythraia in 1960.
