= Greek Military Police =

Military Police Στρατονομία
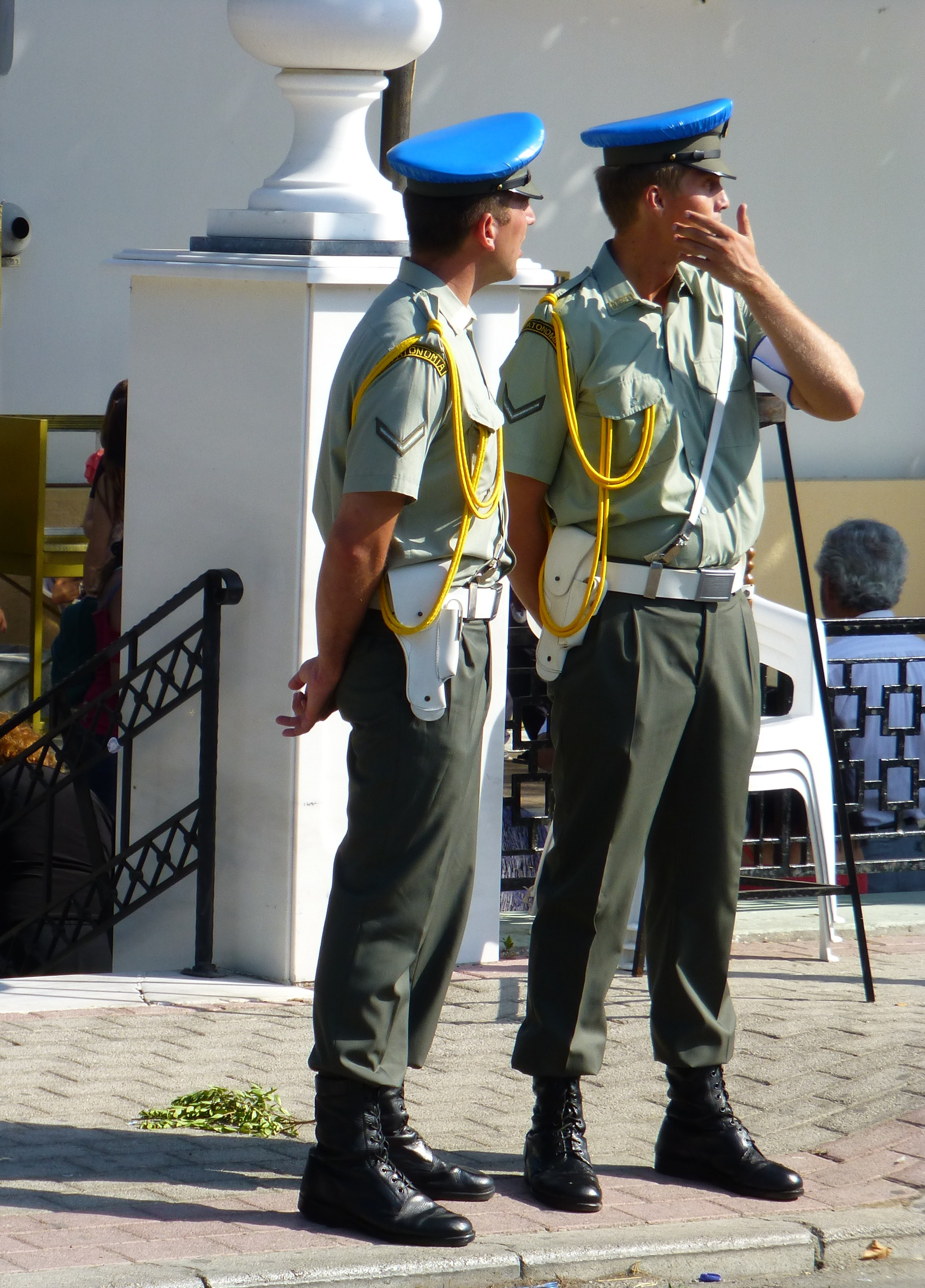
- Members of the current Military Police
- Active: 1951–1976 (Greek Military Police); 1976–present (Stratonomia)
- Country: Greece
- Branch: Hellenic Army
- Role: Military Police
- Headquarters: 37.980959°N 23.752130°E

Insignia
- Abbreviation: ΕΣΑ (1951–1976); ΣΝ (1976–present)

The Stratonomia, (Note: Greek: Στρατονομία, romanized: Stratonomía, IPA: [stɾatonoˈmi.a]) formerly known as the Greek Military Police (GMP) (Note: Ελληνική Στρατιωτική Αστυνομία (ΕΣΑ), Hellinikí Stratiotikí Astynomía (HSA)) between 1951 and 1976, is the military police of the Hellenic Army. It became the main security (secret police) and espionage organisation during the Greek military junta of 1967–1974, as martial law was introduced widely. Its Special Investigative Section engaged in widespread abuse against officers and soldiers and thus, following the fall of the junta and the restoration of democracy in 1974, it was gradually cleansed of torturers and reorganised into its current form.

== Establishment ==
The Military Police was established in 1951, as Greece was preparing to join NATO. Up until then, the Greek Army did not have a specialised military police force, with the Hellenic Gendarmerie acting as military police whereas necessary. Being posted in the GMP was a major bonus for Army officers because it had extensive powers within the military, even before the dictatorship. Both the officers and the soldiers who served in the GMP were picked for their extreme, almost paranoid, anti-communism. This resulted in making the GMP a bastion of the most conservative and anti-democratic members of the Greek officer corps. Men wore a distinctive uniform with a royal blue cap cover (whilst the soldiers wore a beret at the time), golden lanyard on their right shoulder and an armband with the letters ΕΣΑ around their left arm. The uniform remains unchanged save for the ΕΣΑ acronym, which has now been replaced by ΣΝ.

== During the junta ==
In April 1967, shortly after seizing power in a coup, junta leader George Papadopoulos appointed Dimitrios Ioannides chief of the GMP, which gradually had been transformed into an internal security army.

When Papadopoulos declared martial law after the 1967 coup, he increased the power of the GMP even further by making it the junta's chief arm of law and order as well as repression. Under Ioannides, the GMP rose to a force of more than 20,000 men.

Thousands of the junta's political opponents were arrested by the GMP and sent to some of the Aegean Sea's most desolate islands, called the prison islands. Many of the allegations of prisoner torture under the Papadopoulos regime involved the GMP, in particular its Special Investigative Section (SIS). (Note: Εἰδικὸν Ἀνακριτικὸν Τμῆμα (ΕΑΤ), Eidikón Anakritikón Tmíma (EAT))

Use of torture chambers by the GMP during interrogations was reported during the junta years. Alexandros Panagoulis was one example of a person tortured at the GMP interrogation cell units, Greek politician Nikos Konstantopoulos was another example. Army Major Spyros Moustaklis was left brain damaged and unable to speak after the torture he endured at the GMP.

Alarmed at moves Papadopoulos was making towards a transition to democratic rule, Ioannidis used his position and power as GMP chief to oust him from power.

The GMP was disbanded in 1974 by Constantine Karamanlis and its leading members involved in torture were court-martialled and sentenced during the Greek junta trials, although many served only token prison terms. This was because torture was not a recorded criminal offence in the penal code when it was perpetrated, and thus they could only be prosecuted for grievous bodily harm. Three GMP members (out of the 37 prosecuted) were sentenced to 23, 22, and 17 years in prison as their charges included assault against superior officers held in the GMP after the 1973 mutiny plot, with charges later reduced upon appeal.

=== Members ===
Research based on interviews with 21 former GMP members shows that all had been men had been drafted, first into regular military service and then into the GMP. Carried out by Janice T. Gibson and Mika Haritos-Fatouros, the research also showed that recruits underwent series of rigorous treatments and training over a matter of months in order to prepare them psychologically for the task of torturing detainees.

=== Buildings ===
The headquarters of the Special Interrogation Sections of the Military Police was in a building which now houses the Eleftherios Venizelos Museum in Athens.

=== Operating doctrine ===
According to witnesses at the court martial proceedings, the GMP's operating doctrine was:

"Those who enter here, exit either as friends or as cripples."

== See also ==
- Military police
- Your Neighbor's Son
