= Political engineering =

Designing of political institutions in a society

In political science, political engineering is the designing of political institutions in a society and often involves the use of paper decrees, in the form of laws, referendums, ordinances, or otherwise, to try to achieve some desired effect.

The criteria and constraints used in such design vary depending on the optimization methods used. Usually democratic political systems have not been deemed suitable as subjects of political engineering methods. Political engineering can also be employed to design alternative voting procedures in a democratic system.
