= Messinian Uprising of 1834 =

Popular uprising in 1834

The Messenian Uprising of 1834 was the first socio-political uprising in modern Greece and the first movement in Greece to demand a constitution. Its main objectives were the reduction of taxation, the abolition of King Otto's Regency, his immediate coronation, and the release of the imprisoned fighters of the 1821 Greek War of Independence. It began on July 29, 1834, with the capture of Kyparissia by the revolutionaries and ended with their defeat by government troops in the battle at the village of Soulou, near Megalopolis, on August 13 of the same year. Although the movement's goals were not achieved, the revolution laid the groundwork for further demands, eventually leading to the granting of a Constitution about ten years later, following the Revolution of September 3, 1843.

== Background ==
After the Greek War of Independence in 1821, those who had fought for Greece's liberation found themselves marginalized and excluded from the military, which was instead composed of Bavarian mercenaries. The Regency's attempt to generate revenue through heavy taxation, the abolition of democratic institutions such as local self-governance (replaced by regency appointed mayors), and measures to reduce the influence of the Greek Orthodox Church led to unbearable poverty and widespread discontent. Theodoros Kolokotronis, aligned with the pro-Russian party (the Nappists), which enjoyed the greatest support due to the shared factor of Orthodoxy, repeatedly voiced his opposition to these policies in harsh terms. When the Greek Orthodox Church was declared autocephalous and independent from the Ecumenical Patriarchate of Constantinople, Kolokotronis, as leader of the Russian party, sent a report to Tsar Nicolas I condemning the Regency for this action.

This led to his arrest by the government of his old adversary, Ioannis Kolettis, who represented the pro-French party. There is information suggesting that Kolettis may have incited the revolution, possibly in collaboration with Josef Ludwig von Armansperg, the head of the Regency, seeking a pretext to remove ardent supporters of Kolokotronis and the pro-Russian party. Armansperg, for his part, also sought to consolidate his control over the Regency and aimed to oust Georg Ludwig von Maurer from it.

The final straw came after the trial and death sentence of Kolokotronis and Plapoutas on May 25, 1834.

== Events ==
At dawn on July 30, 1834, Giannakis Gritzalis, a pioneer of the Greek War of Independence and a close ally of Kolokotronis, seized Kyparissia (then the capital of Messenia) with 500 men. In the preceding nights, Gritzalis, along with 100-250 men, primarily from the villages of Psari and Kouvela, had hidden in houses belonging to Nappists and in Kyparissia’s castle. On July 31, the prefect, the director of the prefecture, the royal tax collector, and the region's doctor were taken hostage to Psari, where they remained until August 11 at Gritzalis's house. In Kyparissia, the rebels abolished all state institutions, replacing them with a revolutionary committee.

The captured doctor reported on his arrest, stating: “When the enraged armed men were asked why they revolted, they all answered in unison that they were burdened by heavy taxation. Among other taxes, they even paid grosia for their dogs. They decided to arrest these officials and deliver them bound to His Majesty to expedite the enthronement of the King. Additionally, they intended to send a petition from Arcadia to His Majesty expressing their grievances and explaining why they took up arms.”

Following the capture of Kyparissia, the revolutionary committee issued two proclamations. The first was directed to the Greek people, outlining the primary objectives of the uprising: the release of Kolokotronis and Plapoutas, the establishment of a constitution, and the reduction of oppressive taxation. The second was addressed to King Otto, highlighting the dire state of governance. It condemned the dysfunctional government mechanisms that oppressed the populace, the severe economic hardships faced by the rural population, and the widespread abuses of both executive and judicial power.

In Garantza (modern Kato Melpeia), the 89-year-old Mitropetrovas, father-in-law of Giannakis Gritzalis, and teacher and friend of Kolokotronis, mobilized 98 men including his grandchildren, advancing to Androusa, which they captured. Simultaneously, in Aslanaga (modern Aris), Anastasios Tzamalis launched an attack, driving out Bavarian soldiers from the village. The Bavarians returned and besieged him, but the siege was broken by Mitropetrovas’s forces, and together they proceeded to capture Messini.

That same day, uprisings occurred in Drembouni (Lykaio) in Arcadia, with rebels advancing towards Megalopolis. The following day, cousins of the imprisoned general Plapoutas, Kollias and Mitros, along with Kolokotronis’s nephew Nikitas Zervinis, armed themselves and marched toward Zaha and Sklirou. On August 4, Giannakis Gritzalis captured Megalopolis without resistance and continued to occupy Stemnitsa and Zigovisti, where he met other revolutionaries. Although they failed to capture Dimitsana, they proceeded to take Lagadia, Vytina, and Chrysovitsi.

The government of Kolettis reacted swiftly, managing to regain control of the situation. The first measure was a proclamation on August 4, offering amnesty to the rebels if they surrendered within four days, while placing a bounty of 3,000 drachmas on the heads of the movement’s leaders, dead or alive. The second measure involved mobilizing the entire army under the command of Smaltz, Hatzichristos, Gardikiotis Grivas, and Kanellos Deligiannis. Kolettis also moved to isolate the rebels from potential allies by granting amnesty to the Maniots and promoting Roumeliotes. He dismissed the despised Minister of Education Schinas and declared martial law in Messenia and other areas sympathetic to the rebellious chieftains.

The rebels regrouped near Karytaina, but the decisive battle occurred at Soulo near Megalopolis on August 13. A government force of 4,000 Bavarians, bolstered by 3,000 mercenaries, a strong cavalry contingent, and artillery, attacked and defeated the revolutionaries. They reached Psari, freed the captured officials, arrested Gritzalis, and entered Kyparissia and Andritsaina. At the same time, a force of 12,000 soldiers, including Bavarians, irregular Roumeliotes, and Maniots, reached Aslanaga, where Mitropetrovas and Tzamalis were located. They crushed the rebels, captured them, and imprisoned them in Pylos. Aslanaga was completely burned by government troops.

== Aftermath ==
At the Military Court for Messienia and Karytaina, convened in Kyparissia on September 15, 1834, Giannakis Gritzalis was the first to stand trial. He assumed full responsibility for the uprising, and when the proceedings concluded, he was sentenced to death. The execution took place two hours later. Gritzalis refused to have his eyes covered and is said to have declared, "Brothers, I am dying unjustly. I sought the rights of the Greeks." During his imprisonment, friends and relatives appealed to King Otto, requesting clemency due to Gritzalis's invaluable services to the country during the War of Independence. Otto granted a pardon, however, it arrived in Kyparissia a few hours after the execution. Many believe that political opponents intentionally delayed its delivery. On October 8, the military court in Pylos sentenced Mitropetrovas and Tzamalis to death. Tzamalis was executed summarily, while Mitropetrovas was granted clemency due to his old age and his contributions to the War of Independence. The remaining leaders of the uprising were sentenced to 15 years in prison but were later pardoned.

Armansperg achieved his goal of ousting the other two regents Maurer and Abel. Their replacements, Heideck and Kobell, became compliant instruments of his authority. After Otto was crowned in 1835 he met with Gritzalis's widow and offered her anything she desired. She asked for a bell for the new church of Saint Dimitrios in Psari. Otto agreed and the bell was gifted to the village and to this day it can still be seen with the writing "Otto, King of Greece - 1835" on it. In 1837 Armansperg was dismissed and returned to Germany.

The consequences of the rebellion were particularly dire for the region of Trifylia, especially the villages that had spearheaded the revolt. Despite their significant contributions and prestige gained during the independence struggle, a pattern of marginalization emerged and persisted for many years at various levels. However, the memory of this spontaneous popular uprising, which effectively served as a prelude to the Uprising of September 3, 1843, remains vivid more than a century and a half later and is celebrated yearly at the village of Psari.
