= Skala, Messenia =

Skala Σκάλα
- Community
- Location within Greece
- Country: Greece
- Administrative region: Peloponnese
- Regional unit: Messenia
- Municipality: Oichalia, Messenia
- Elevation: 97 m (318 ft)

Population (2021)
  - Community: 190
- Time zone: UTC+2 (EET)
  - Summer (DST): UTC+3 (EEST)

Skala (Greek: Σκάλα) is a village located in the municipality of Oichalia, Messenia, Peloponnese in Greece. It is situated in the interior of the Messenia Plain, around 21 km north of Kalamata and at an altitude of around 90 meters.

== History ==
During the Ottoman Empire the nearby settlement was used as a place of execution and atrocities by the Ottoman authorities. It is believed that Skala played a pivotal role during the Greek war of independence when on the 22nd of March 1821 Greek forces attacked the Ottoman guards of the village. Kolokotronis mentions in his memoirs that he had met in Skala with Papaflessas to plan for the war. In 1825 Prime Minister Georgios Kountouriotis settled in Skala with Alexandros Mavrokordatos to prepare an attack against Ibrahim.

== Climate ==
Skala enjoys a sunny and warm Mediterranean climate (Köppen: Csa). According to the data of the National Observatory of Athens station, winters are mild while summers are extremely hot by Greece's standards. Ιt is considered Greece's hottest area in terms of summer mean maximum temperatures and this is due to its inland location next to the Taygetos mountain which provides constant hot fohn winds during the summer. Skala records summer mean maximum temperatures that are similar to Cordoba, Andalusia in Spain. On average Skala records 14 days per year with temperatures over 40.0 °C (104.0 °F). In July 2025 Skala reached 45.8 °C (114.4 °F).

Climate data for Skala, Messenia (88 m a.s.l.) Climate: Hot-summer Mediterranean climate (Csa) • USDA: 10b (2.4°C)
Month	Jan	Feb	Mar	Apr	May	Jun	Jul	Aug	Sep	Oct	Nov	Dec	Year
Record high °C (°F)	20.8 (69.4)	23.6 (74.5)	26.6 (79.9)	31.3 (88.3)	35.4 (95.7)	43.2 (109.8)	45.8 (114.4)	42.0 (107.6)	38.9 (102.0)	34.0 (93.2)	26.8 (80.2)	20.5 (68.9)	45.8 (114.4)
Mean daily maximum °C (°F)	16.4 (61.5)	17.1 (62.8)	19.7 (67.5)	23.8 (74.8)	27.8 (82.0)	35.5 (95.9)	37.8 (100.0)	37.2 (99.0)	32.7 (90.9)	24.0 (75.2)	21.4 (70.5)	17.8 (64.0)	25.9 (78.7)
Daily mean °C (°F)	12.4 (54.3)	12.7 (54.9)	14.6 (58.3)	17.9 (64.2)	21.4 (70.5)	28.2 (82.8)	30.6 (87.1)	30.2 (86.4)	26.4 (79.5)	19.4 (66.9)	17.4 (63.3)	13.6 (56.5)	20.4 (68.7)
Mean daily minimum °C (°F)	8.5 (47.3)	8.3 (46.9)	9.4 (48.9)	12.0 (53.6)	15.0 (59.0)	20.9 (69.6)	23.3 (73.9)	23.1 (73.6)	20.1 (68.2)	14.8 (58.6)	13.4 (56.1)	9.3 (48.7)	14.8 (58.7)
Record low °C (°F)	1.5 (34.7)	2.7 (36.9)	5.1 (41.2)	6.4 (43.5)	5.6 (42.1)	15.4 (59.7)	17.6 (63.7)	19.5 (67.1)	15.8 (60.4)	9.1 (48.4)	9.1 (48.4)	6.8 (44.2)	1.5 (34.7)
Average rainfall mm (inches)	159.1 (6.26)	154.0 (6.06)	62.5 (2.46)	49.9 (1.96)	24.5 (0.96)	1.0 (0.04)	7.7 (0.30)	6.5 (0.26)	22.8 (0.90)	122.8 (4.83)	182.4 (7.18)	128.6 (5.06)	921.8 (36.27)
Source 1: National Observatory of Athens (Dec 2023 - Aug 2026)
Source 2: Skala Messenia N.O.A station.

== Municipality ==
The municipality Oichalia was formed at the 2011 local government reform by the merger of the following 5 former municipalities, that became municipal units:

- Andania
- Dorio
- Eira
- Meligalas
- Oichalia

The municipality has an area of 415.433 km^{2}, the municipal unit 59.060 km^{2}.
