= Skliros =

Skliros Σκληρός
- Community
- Location within Greece
- Coordinates: 37°26′28″N 21°55′03″E
- Country: Greece
- Administrative region: Peloponnese
- Regional unit: Messenia
- Municipality: Oichalia
- Municipal unit: Eira

Population (2021)
  - Community: 48
- Time zone: UTC+2 (EET)
  - Summer (DST): UTC+3 (EEST)

Skliros (Greek: Σκληρός) is a village in the municipality of Oichalia, Messenia, Greece. In its district lies the Temple of Apollo at Bassae. It is 5 km (3.1 mi) south of Andritsaina, 4 km (2.5 mi) northwest of Kakaletri and 20 km (12 mi) west of Megalopoli.

== History ==
In ancient times, the village belonged to the region of ancient Arcadia and the city of Phigalia. The village was originally founded in 900-950 AD. by residents of the surrounding neighbourhoods. After a number of years, the village was given as a personal manor or "Pronoia" (Greek: πρόνοια, meaning "care" or "forethought") to Romanos Skleros, the son of the Byzantine General, Bardas Skleros, where he settled with his family. Romanos had married the sister of Emperor Constantine VII. From Romanos' came the villages new name, "Sklirou" (Greek: Σκληρού).

During the Frankish occupation, the area of the village may have belonged to the Barony of Karytaina, or was on its borders. Close to the village is the Castle of St. Helen (modern day Castle of Theisoa). During Constantine Paleologos campaign against the Franks, the castle was used by the inhabitants of Sklirou.
