= Paroreia =

Paroreia (Ancient Greek: Παρώρεια) may refer to:

- Paroreia (Arcadia), a town of ancient Arcadia, Greece
- Paroreia (Thrace), a town of ancient Thrace, Greece
