= Melpeia =

Ancient site in Arcadia, Greece

Melpeia (Ancient Greek: Μέλπεια) was a locality (Ancient Greek: χωρίον) in ancient Arcadia, situated on the mountain Nomia, which is a part of Mount Lycaeus. There was a sanctuary of the Nomian Pan, who is said to have discovered the pan flute here. According to the Arcadians, the name "Nomia" was derived from the nymph Nomia. It was situated near Lycosura.

A sanctuary of Pan, very likely the one reported by Pausanias, was excavated in 1902 at a ruined chapel of Ai Strategos near the village of Neda (formerly Berekla). Finds included bronze figurines of the archaic and classical periods and an ash altar.

The present villages Kato Melpeia and Ano Melpeia in the municipality of Oichalia in northern Messenia were named after Melpeia.
