= Psari =

Psari (Greek: Ψάρι, meaning "fish") may refer to the following places in Greece:

- Psari, Iraia, Arcadia, a village in Arcadia, part of the municipal unit of Iraia
- Psari, Trikolonoi, Arcadia. a village in Arcadia, part of the municipal unit of Trikolonoi
- Psari, Elis, a settlement in Elis, part of the municipal unit Vouprasia
- Psari, Corinthia, a settlement in Corinthia, part of the municipal unit Stymfalia
- Psari, Messenia, a settlement in Messenia, part of the municipal unit Dorio
- Psari (mountain), a mountaintop in Laconia
