= Skia =

Skia or SKIA may refer to:

- Skia (typeface), a humanist sans-serif typeface
- Skia Graphics Engine, a software library that provides functionality for computer graphics operations
- Shade (mythology) (classical Greek skia, Greek: σκιά), the spirit or ghost of a dead person, residing in the underworld
- South Kerry Independent Alliance, former name of an Irish political party
- SKIA College, Philippines

== See also ==
- Skias, settlement in ancient Arcadia
- Skia Dwa or Golden Stool, royal and divine throne of the Ashanti people
