= Psari, Messenia =

Psari Ψάρι
- Community
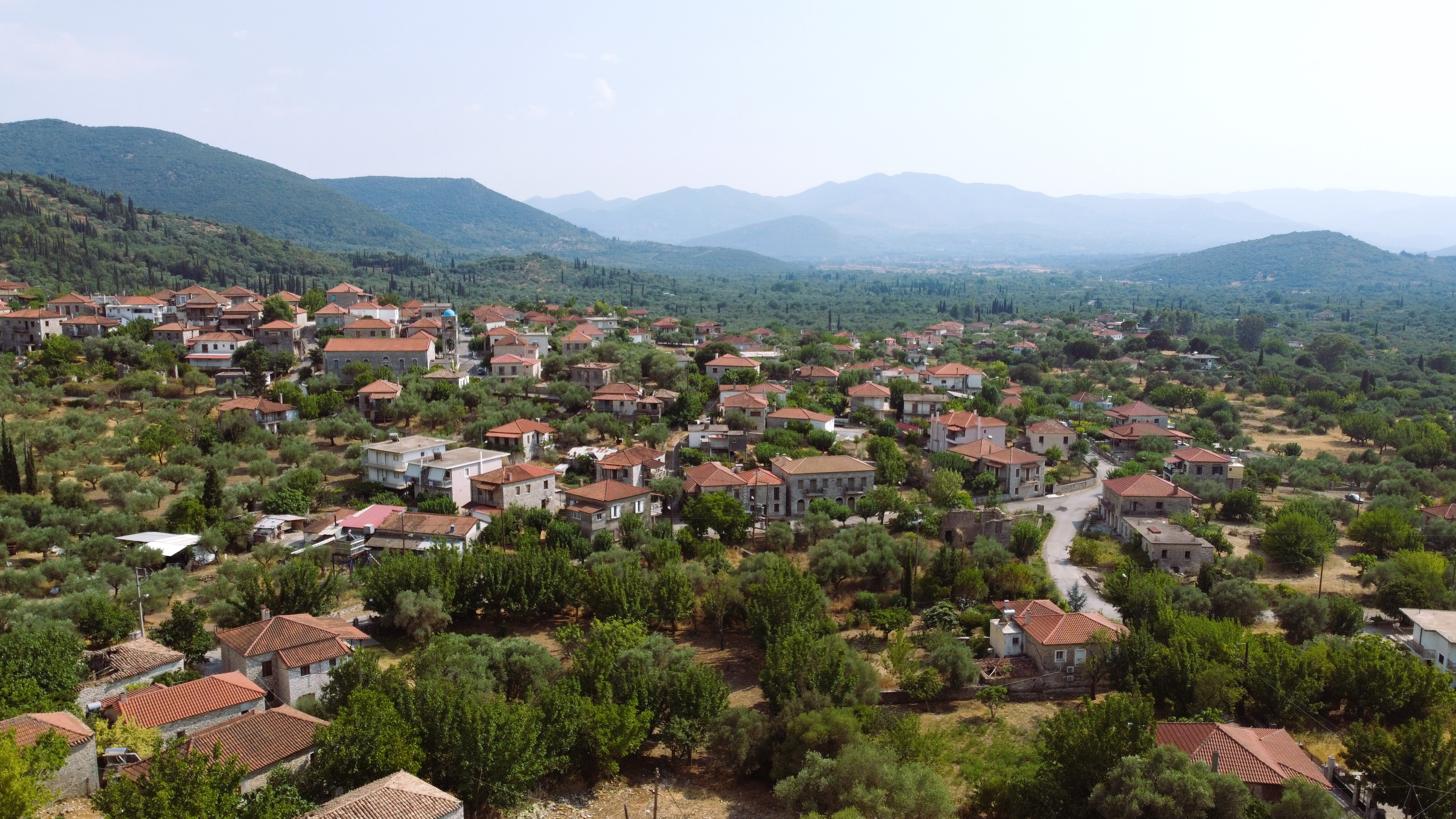

- Location within Greece
- Coordinates: 37°19′41″N 21°53′13″E
- Country: Greece
- Administrative region: Peloponnese
- Regional unit: Messenia
- Municipality: Oichalia
- Municipal unit: Dorio

Population (2021)
  - Community: 227
- Time zone: UTC+2 (EET)
  - Summer (DST): UTC+3 (EEST)

Psari (Greek: Ψάρι) is a village in Messenia, Greece. Since 2011, it is part of the municipality of Oichalia according to the Kallikratis program, while previously it was part of the municipality of Dorio. According to the 2021 census, it has a population of 227.

== Name ==
According to the historian K. Sathas, the village of Psari is one of those named after their owner. However, it might also derive from the ancient word "Opsarion," which means "harsh place." The first mention of the village is in the Ottoman census of 1461, in which four families were recorded, three of which were the families of Petros Psaris, Kosmas Psaris, and Ioannis Psaris. It is likely the village name originates from those first inhabitants.

== Geography ==
Psari is built at an altitude of 220 meters, offering a view and a mild climate. It is located approximately 5 kilometers from Dorio. Its original location was in Ano Psari, 4 kilometers away, at an altitude of 550 meters. Ano Psari is built on a flat, and smooth plateau surrounded by low, shrub-covered, and forested mountains. The springs with abundant water provided favorable conditions for habitation. After the Greek War of Independence in 1821, the residents of Ano Psari moved to the lowlands and established the village at its current location.

== History ==
Psari is one of the Soulimochoria of mountainous Trifylia, initially settled by the Dredes. According to Athanasios Grigoriadis, the first families settled in Ano Psari around 1630, and these families were the Kontaios from Soulima (Ano Dorio) and the Sgouros from Epirus. However, evidence discovered in the Ottoman archives shows that Psari was already inhabited by 1461, with the census at the time recording four families. Around 1660, Anagnostis (Alexis) Daras arrived from Zaimogli (Drosia) in Pylia, where he had taken refuge after being persecuted by the Turks from Dara in Mantineia. A few years later, two more families, the Karraios and the Ntoulimanaios, arrived from Megalopoli. Over time, more families joined, integrating with the original five.

At the time of the Kingdom of the Morea, Psari is mentioned in the 1689 Venetian census as a village in the province of Arcadia (Kyparissia).

In 1805, Psari is mentioned as part of the koli of Sulima (Ano Dorio), of the kaza of Arcadia. The area produced vallonea, butter, cheese, honey, sheep, cattle and small amounts of olive oil.

On April 24, 1824, the Battle of Psari took place as part of the Greek War of Independence. Ibrahim Pasha sent Aslan Bey with 6,000 infantry, 500 cavalry, and 10 cannons against the Arcadian army that had camped in Psari. The battle that followed lasted for four hours. The defendants captured four enemy flags, 23 horses, and one cannon. In this battle, all the women of the village, along with others from neighboring villages, participated by distributing ammunition to the warriors or firing their rifles and pistols. The Egyptians suffered losses of 250 soldiers and 11 officers killed, as well as 80 wounded, while the Arcadians lost 31 men and had 9 wounded.

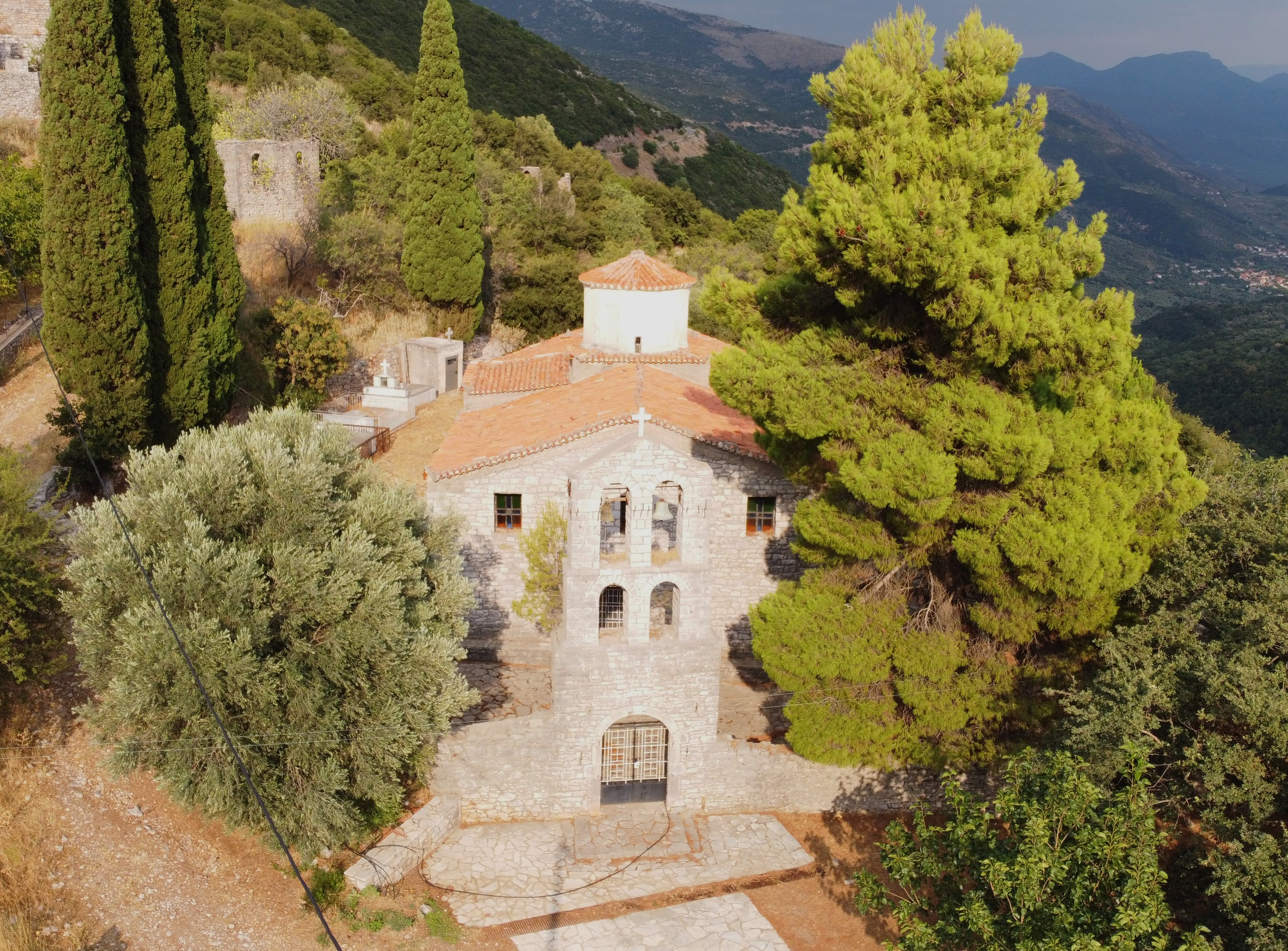
The church of St Dimitrios in Ano Psari

The Messenian Uprising of 1834 began in Psari. At dawn on July 30, 1834, Giannakis Gritzalis, a pioneer of the Greek War of Independence and a close ally of Kolokotronis, seized Kyparissia (then the capital of Messenia) with 500 men. In the preceding nights, Gritzalis, along with 100-250 men, primarily from the villages of Psari and Kouvela, had hidden in the town. On July 31, the prefect, the director of the prefecture, the royal tax collector, and the region's doctor were taken hostage to Psari, where they remained until August 11 at Gritzalis's house. The uprising ended when the rebels were defeated at the Battle of Soulo near Megalopolis on August 13. In the aftermath of the uprising, Psari, along with the rest of the region of Trifylia was marginalized despite the village's significant contributions to the Greek War of Independence.

In 1836 (Government Gazette 80/28-12-1836), Psari, Dimantra, Syrtzi (Syrizo), Klesoura (Amfithea), and Katsoura (Ano Vasiliko) became part of the Municipality of Elektrida, which was established with Psari as its seat. The first mayor was Antonis Syrakos, a fighter and officer from the Greek War of Independence. One of the first public schools in free Greece operated in Psari. A primary school was established in 1840, and later, an all girl school was founded in Psari by the Royal Decree of July 31, 1892, to serve the villages of Psari, Klesoura, and Chrysochori in the Municipality of Elektra (Government Gazette No. 263, August 4, 1892).

== Demographics ==
Year	Population	Year	Population	Year	Population	Year	Population
1461	approx. 20 (4 households)	1844	840	1920	1712	2001	615
1514	approx. 110 (22 households)	1851	987	1928	1882	2011	502
1569	approx. 250 (50 households)	1861	855	1940	1825	2021	227
1571	approx. 370 (74 households)	1876	1443	1951	1459		
1583	approx. 350 (70 households)	1879	1223	1961	994		
1689	76	1889	1280	1971	683		
1700	120	1896	1443	1981	812		
1715	approx. 235 (47 households)	1907	1706	1991	539		

In the Ottoman censuses of 1461, 1514, 1569, 1571, 1583, and 1715, only the number of households is recorded, with an average of 5 people estimated per household.

== People ==
- Markos Daras (1700–1745), Arcadian klepht and armatolos.
- Giannakis Gritzalis (1791–1834), revolutionary leader of the Greek War of Independence.
- Antonis Daras (1780–1845), revolutionary leader of the Greek War of Independence.
- Nasos Kontos (1770–1840), klepht, armatolos, and revolutionary leader of the Greek War of Independence.
- Antonis Syrakos (d. 1863), revolutionary leader of the Greek War of Independence.
- Georgios Gritzalis (b. 1793), officer and revolutionary fighter of the Greek War of Independence, officer of the National Guard.
- Dimitris Gritzalis, head of Theodoros Kolokotronis's personal guard and commander of the Arcadian militia (1831–1832).
- Georgios Syrakos, revolutionary leader of the Greek War of Independence.
- Konstantinos Gritzalis, fighter in the Greek War of Independence, officer of the National Guard.
- Athanasios Adamopoulos (d. 1821), fighter and guide in the Greek War of Independence.
- Ioannis Nasis, fighter in the Greek War of Independence.
- Giannakis Moutzios, fighter in the Greek War of Independence.
- Lymberis Giannopoulos, fighter and guide of soldiers in the Greek War of Independence.
- Konstantinos Gritzalis, fighter in the Greek War of Independence.
- Dimitris Konstantopoulos, son of Konstantinos Gritzalis, fighter in the Greek War of Independence.
- Giannis Boutzos (d. 1828), fighter in the Greek War of Independence.
- Georgios Papageorgiou (1919–1995), folklorist, poet, and writer.
- Adamantios Androutsopoulos (1919–2000), lawyer, minister, and Prime Minister of Greece (1973–1974).
- Ioannis Charalambopoulos (1919–2014), Army officer, Minister of Foreign Affairs (1981–1985), Minister of National Defense (1986–1989), and Deputy Prime Minister (1985–1989).
