= Syrna =

Syrna Σύρνα
- Community
- Location within Greece
- Coordinates: 37°30′N 22°6′E
- Country: Greece
- Administrative region: Peloponnese
- Regional unit: Arcadia
- Municipality: Gortynia
- Municipal unit: Trikolonoi
- Elevation: 797 m (2,615 ft)

Population (2021)
  - Community: 49
- Time zone: UTC+2 (EET)
  - Summer (DST): UTC+3 (EEST)
- Postal code: 222 00
- Area code: 27940
- Vehicle registration: TP

Syrna (Greek: Σύρνα) is a mountain village and a community in the municipal unit of Trikolonoi, western Arcadia, Greece. Syrna is situated on a mountain slope above the right bank of the river Alfeios, at about 800 m elevation. In 2011 Syrna had a population of 60 for the village and 62 for the community, which includes the village Ano Kalyvia. Syrna is 2 km northwest of Palamari, 4 km southeast of Elliniko, 6 km northeast of Karytaina and 6 km southeast of Stemnitsa.

It is postulated to have been the site of the ancient Greek city of Thyreum.

== Population ==
Year	Village population	Community population
1981	-	224
1991	159	-
2001	188	210
2011	60	62
2021	42	49

== See also ==
- List of settlements in Arcadia
