= Psari, Trikolonoi, Arcadia =

Psari Ψάρι
- Settlement
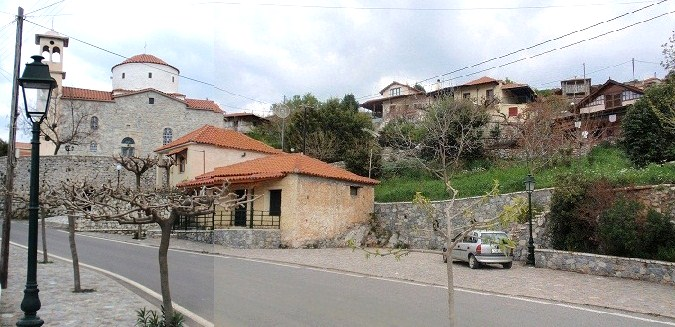
- The main road and the village church

- Location within Greece
- Coordinates: 37°29′N 22°7′E
- Country: Greece
- Administrative region: Peloponnese
- Regional unit: Arcadia
- Municipality: Gortynia
- Municipal unit: Trikolonoi
- Community: Palamari

Population (2021)
  - Total: 29
- Time zone: UTC+2 (EET)
  - Summer (DST): UTC+3 (EEST)
- Postal code: 220 22
- Area code: 27910
- Vehicle registration: TP

Psari (Greek: Ψάρι) is a village in the Municipality of Gortynia in Arcadia. From 1997 to 2010 it was part of the Municipality of Trikolonoi. It is located at an altitude of approximately 750 meters, at a distance of 17 kilometers from Megalopoli and 11 kilometers from Stemnitsa. It is a traditional settlement with stone-built houses on the outskirts of Mount Mainalo in the heart of mountainous Arcadia. The inhabitants of the village are engaged in agriculture and livestock farming. The village celebrates every year on the feast of the Zoodochos Pege, while cultural events are held during August. The climate is mountainous with cold winters and cool summers.

== History ==
According to archaeological findings, the village was inhabited from late antiquity at a point located northeast of the current settlement. Its original name was Paroreia.

There are various speculations about the current name of the village, with the two most prevalent being that the name either comes from a breeder of fish-colored horses (in the Greek language the word psari means fish) or from the Old Slavic word pbsarb meaning dog breeder.

The first written reference we have about Psari is from Theodoros Kolokotronis in his memoirs, where he refers to the village under the name Psari. He says the following: "The Turks took us from close range, we were taking bread ravenously. The Turks reached us at Psari and we fought all day. My companions started to leave". It is assumed that at that time a breeder of fish-colored horses lived in the village. He used to visit the Byzantine church of Agios Georgios that exists in the village (today is the chapel of the village cemetery), since during the Turkish occupation there had been a metropolitan cathedral. During one of his visits, his presence was betrayed to the Turks by the monks of the Monastery of Agios Ioannis which existed just outside the village, causing him to flee from the residents at the last moment. Later he returned to the village and burned the monastery as revenge for the betrayal of the monks. Today the ruins of the monastery can be seen on a hill in Palamarovrysi.

The administrative and population development of the village follows the pattern of the wider area which gradually experienced some development until the beginning of the 20th century but then the population gradually decreased due to immigration to the USA. something the region pioneered as early as the late 1890s.

In the census of the French mission in the Peloponnese in 1830, the village is mentioned with 81 inhabitants and 17 families. In the first official Greek census in 1834, it is recorded under the name Psaraki, belonging to the then Municipality of Vrenthi, based in Zoni, and showing the third largest population of the Municipality. A total of 155 residents and 31 families are listed. Just a few years later in 1844, after changes in the local government, it was annexed to the Municipality of Trikolonoi (its seat was in Stemnitsa) and Georgios “Spanomichos” Diamantopoulos was elected as its first mayor with 20 votes.

In the elections of 1872, there are a total of 61 male voters, with the oldest according to the electoral rolls being Georgios Diamantopoulos of the Demos, born in 1810 and who was the oldest officially recorded resident of the village.

== Landmarks ==
Since 2019, the village has a museum on the history of education in modern Greece, which is housed in the old and renovated school of the village. There is also the Arkadiani multipurpose hall, where there is a traditional food restaurant, a traditional sweets workshop, as well as a small museum.

== Gallery ==
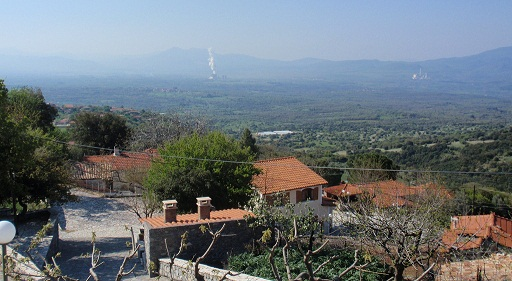
View from the village

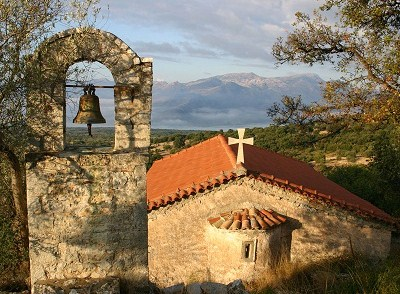
Saint George Byzantine Church (13th century)

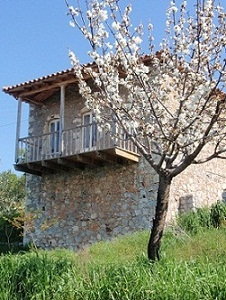
Traditional house

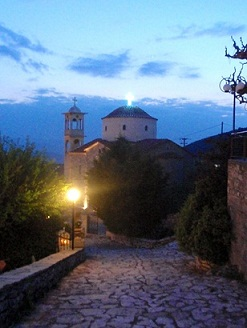
Cobblestone at the church of Zoodochos Pege
