= Charisia =

Charisia (Greek: Χαρισία) may refer to:

- Charisia (city), an ancient Greek city
- Charisia (beetle), a genus in the tribe Rhinotragini
- Charisia, an ancient festival in honour of the Charites
- Charisia, a flower that grew at the Taygetus
