= Trikolonoi =

Trikolonoi Τρικόλωνοι
- Municipal unit
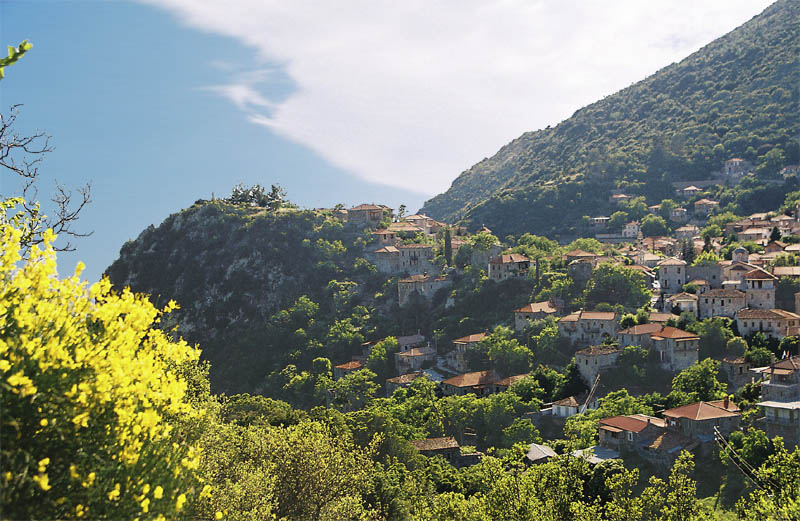

- Location within the regional unit

- Location within Greece
- Coordinates: 37°33′N 22°5′E
- Country: Greece
- Administrative region: Peloponnese
- Regional unit: Arcadia
- Municipality: Gortynia

Area
  - Municipal unit: 102.0 km^{2} (39.4 sq mi)

Population (2021)
  - Municipal unit: 593
  - Municipal unit density: 5.81/km^{2} (15.1/sq mi)
- Time zone: UTC+2 (EET)
  - Summer (DST): UTC+3 (EEST)
- Postal code: 220 24
- Area code: 27950
- Vehicle registration: TP
- Website: www.gortynia.gov.gr

Trikolonoi (Greek: Τρικόλωνοι) is a former municipality in Arcadia, Peloponnese, Greece. Since the 2011 local government reform it is part of the municipality Gortynia, of which it is a municipal unit. The municipal unit has an area of 102.031 km^{2}. The municipal unit includes the villages of Stemnitsa (the former municipal seat), Syrna, Pavlia, Palamari, Psari, Ano Kalyvia and Elliniko. Trikolonoi is located southeast of Dimitsana, west of Tripoli and north of Megalopoli. The place takes its name from the ancient town of Tricoloni.

== Subdivisions ==
The municipal unit Trikolonoi is subdivided into the following communities (constituent villages in brackets):

- Elliniko
- Palamari (Palamari, Psari)
- Pavlia
- Stemnitsa (Stemnitsa, Moni Agiou Ioannou Prodromou)
- Syrna (Syrna, Ano Kalyvia)

== Population history ==
Year	Population
1991	1,255
2001	1,260
2011	578
2021	593

== See also ==
- List of settlements in Arcadia
