= Kakaletri =

Kakaletri Κακαλέτρι
- Community
- Location within Greece
- Coordinates: 37°24′17″N 21°55′57″E
- Country: Greece
- Administrative region: Peloponnese
- Regional unit: Messenia
- Municipality: Oichalia
- Municipal unit: Eira

Population (2021)
  - Community: 25
- Time zone: UTC+2 (EET)
  - Summer (DST): UTC+3 (EEST)

Kakaletri (Greek: Κακαλέτρι) is a village in the municipality of Oichalia, Messenia, Peloponnese, Greece.

The name is related to the Greek family name "Kakaletris", which is often met in places around the village, including Pyrgos (Elis), Kalamata (Messenia) and Sparti (Laconia).
