= Bassae =

Temple of Apollo Epicurius at Bassae
UNESCO World Heritage Site
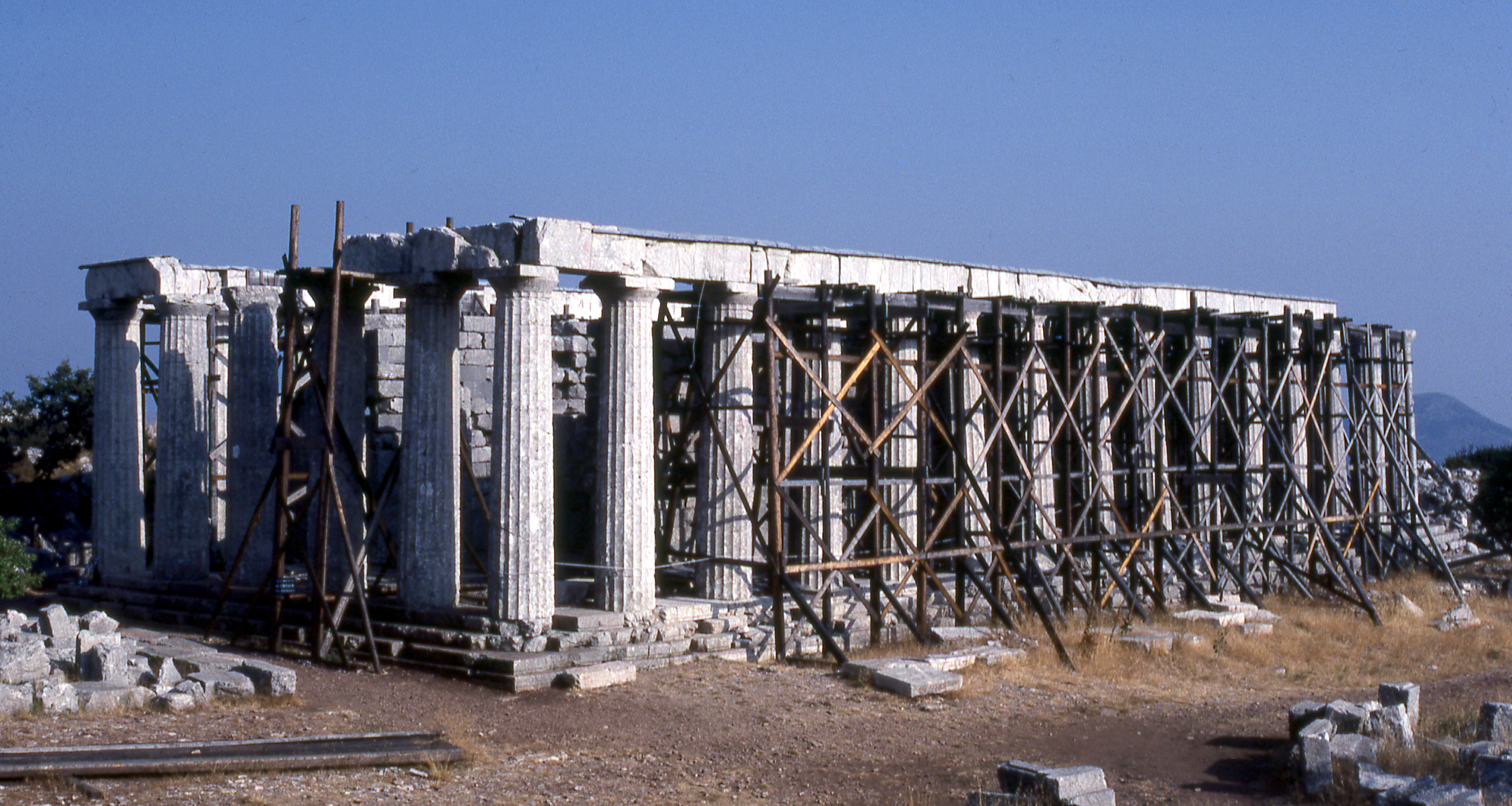
- View of the temple in 1982

- Location within Greece
- Location: Oichalia, Greece
- Criteria: Cultural: (i)(ii)(iii)
- Reference: 392
- Inscription: 1986 (10th Session)
- Area: 20.46 ha (50.6 acres)
- Buffer zone: 201.58 ha (498.1 acres)
- Coordinates: 37°25′47″N 21°54′01″E

Bassae (Latin: Bassae, Ancient Greek: Βάσσαι – Bassai, meaning "little vale in the rocks") is an archaeological site in Oichalia, a municipality in the northeastern part of Messenia, Greece. In classical antiquity, it was part of Arcadia. Bassae lies at an elevation of 1,131 m above sea level on the slopes of Cotylion Mountain. near the village of Skliros, northeast of Figaleia, south of Andritsaina and west of Megalopolis. It is famous for the well-preserved mid- to late-5th century BC Temple of Apollo Epicurius.

Although this temple is geographically remote from major polities of ancient Greece, it is one of the most studied ancient Greek temples because of its multitude of unusual features, and because it has remained almost complete to the present day and, next to the Theseum at Athens, the best preserved of the temples of Greece or elsewhere. The architecture of the temple is strikingly unusual for the period, departing significantly from the norms of Doric and Ionic practice and including what is perhaps the first use of the Corinthian order, and the first temple to have a continuous frieze around the interior of the naos.

The 19th-century British scholar William Mure who visited the site wrote that “there is certainly no remnant of the architectural splendour of Greece more calculated to fascinate the imagination than this temple; whether by its own size and beauty, by the contrast it offers to the wild desolation of the surrounding scenery, or the extent and variety of the prospect from its site.”

Bassae was the first Greek site to be inscribed on the World Heritage List, in 1986.

== History of the Temple of Apollo Epicurius ==
In the Archaic period (7th BC) the people of Phigaleia, helped by their neighbour Oresthasium, retrieved their land from the Spartans and erected a temple in a sanctuary dedicated to Apollo worshipped as "Epikourios", which means "assistant in evils of war". Archaeology has found some architectural pieces in the area probably belonging to the Archaic temple which was in continuous use since the archaic period, and had one or two building phases around 600 and 500 BC while the present temple of Apollo is the last of four on the site and designated Apollo IV.

The temple in its present form was built between 450 and 400 BC during the Peloponnesian War by the Phigaleians in consequence of the relief afforded by Apollo probably during the plague of Athens of 430 BC. The temple is at least three hours walk from Phigaleia (13 km) and consequently more than the 40 stadia which Pausanias mentions as the distance; but this distance perhaps applies to the nearest part of the mountain from the city.

It was supposedly designed by Iktinos, architect at Athens of the Parthenon. Modern scholars are doubtful about this as, though the Doric order used is "extremely similar" to that of the Parthenon, where they differ Bassae is "old-fashioned" yet it was probably built later.

The ancient writer Pausanias praises the temple as eclipsing all others in the Peloponnesos except the Temple of Athena Alea at Tegea by the beauty of its stone and the harmony of its construction.

Pausanias described it in the 2nd century AD:

Phigalia is surrounded by mountains, on the left by the mountain called Kotilios . . . The distance from the city to Mount Kotilios is about forty stades. On the mountain is a place called Bassai, and the temple of Apollon Epikourios (the Helper), which, including the roof, is of stone. Of the temples in the Peloponnesos, this might be placed first after the one at Tegea for the beauty of its stone and for its symmetry. Apollon received his name from the help he gave in time of plague, just as the Athenians gave him the name of Alexikakos (Averter of Evil) for turning the plague away from them. It was at the time of the war between the Peloponnesians and the Athenians that he also saved the Phigalians, and at no other time; the evidence is that of the two surnames of Apollon, which have practically the same meaning, and also the fact that Iktinos, the architect of the temple at Phigalia, was a contemporary of Perikles, and built for the Athenians what is called the Parthenon. My narrative has already said that the tile image of Apollon is in the market-place of Megalopolis.

It was in use until the 4th- or 5th-century AD, when all pagan temples were forcibly closed during the persecution of pagans in the late Roman Empire. Probably because of the remoteness of the site, the temple remained unusually well-preserved. Depictions by artists, which begin in the early 19th century, show the pteron or external colonnade standing complete, and the architrave nearly so. The internal walls were a mass of fallen blocks, but relatively few had been removed for reuse, the normal fate of these conveniently sized pieces.

Floor plan of the Temple of Apollo 1 = Opisthodomos, 2 = Adyton, 3 = Naos, 4 = Pronaos

=== Construction and decoration ===
The temple is aligned north–south, in contrast to the majority of Greek temples which are aligned east–west; its principal entrance is from the north. This was necessitated by the limited space available on the steep slopes of the mountain. To overcome this restriction a door was placed in the side of the temple, perhaps to let light in to illuminate the cult statue.

The temple is of a relatively modest size, with the stylobate measuring 38.3 by 14.5 metres containing a Doric peristyle of six by fifteen columns (hexastyle). It has been proposed that there was a central space in the roof left open to admit light and air but there is no proof of this feature. The temple was constructed entirely out of grey Arcadian limestone except for the Bassae Frieze which was carved from marble (probably in ancient times colored with paint). Like most major temples it has three "rooms" or porches: the pronaos, plus a naos and an opisthodomos. The naos may have housed a cult statue of Apollo, although it is also surmised that the single 'proto-Corinthian' capital discovered by Charles Robert Cockerell and subsequently lost at sea, may have topped the single column that stood in the centre of the naos, and have been intended as an aniconic representation of Apollo Borealis. The temple lacks some optical refinements found in the Parthenon, such as a subtly curved floor, though the columns have entasis.

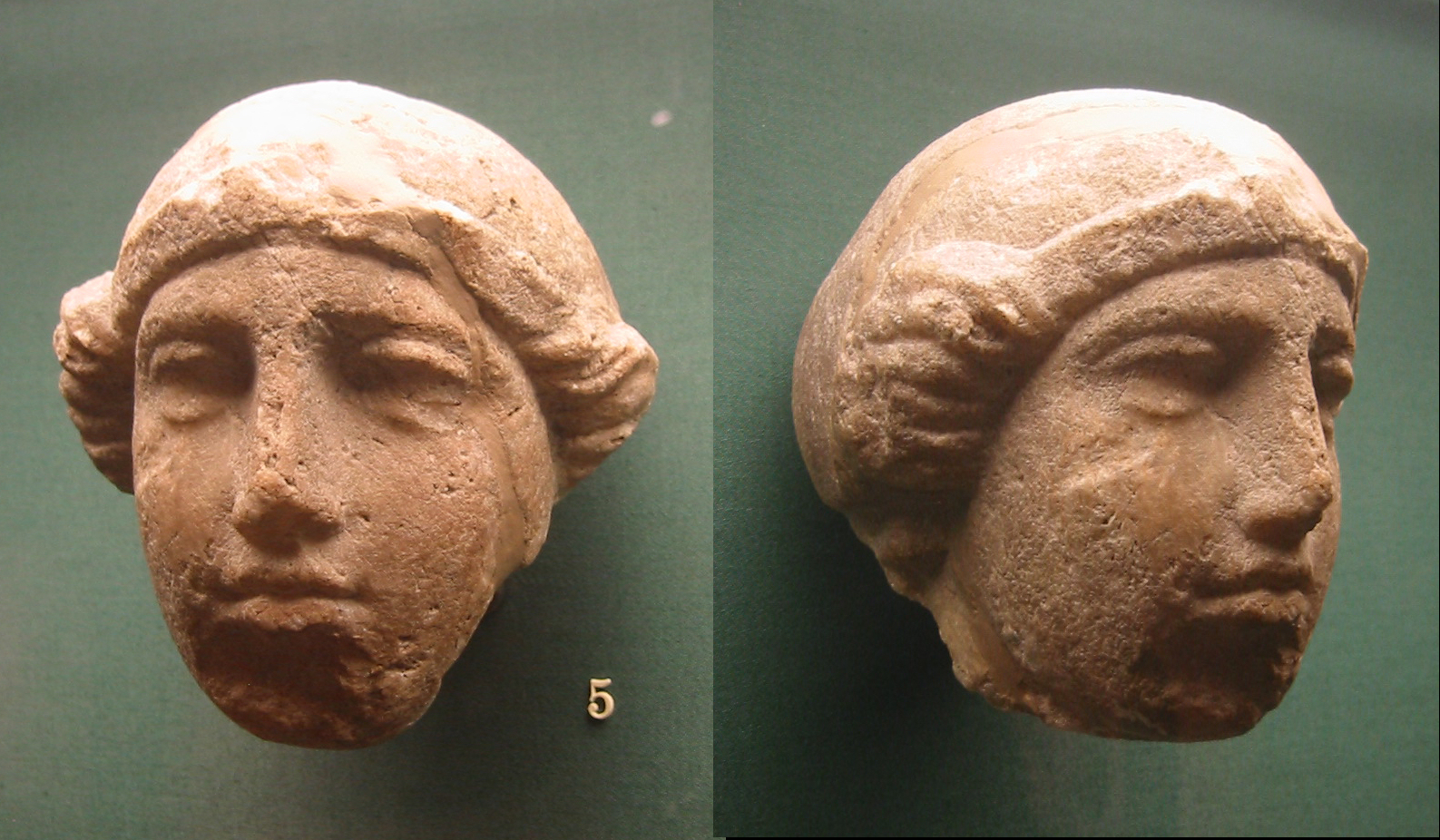
Fragment of a metope, depicting an Amazon, displayed at the British Museum

The temple is unusual in that it has examples of all three of the classical orders used in ancient Greek architecture: Doric, Ionic, and Corinthian. Doric columns form the peristyle while Ionic columns support the interior and a single Corinthian column features in the centre of the interior. The Corinthian capital is the earliest example of the order found to date.

It was relatively sparsely decorated on the exterior. Inside, however, there was a continuous Ionic frieze showing Athenians in battle with Amazons and the Lapiths engaged in battle with Centaurs. This frieze's metopes were removed by Cockerell and taken to the British Museum in 1815 (they are still to be seen in the British Museum's Gallery 16, near the Elgin Marbles). Cockerell decorated the walls of the Ashmolean Museum's Great Staircase and that of the Travellers Club with plaster casts of the same frieze.

=== Re-discovery and removals ===
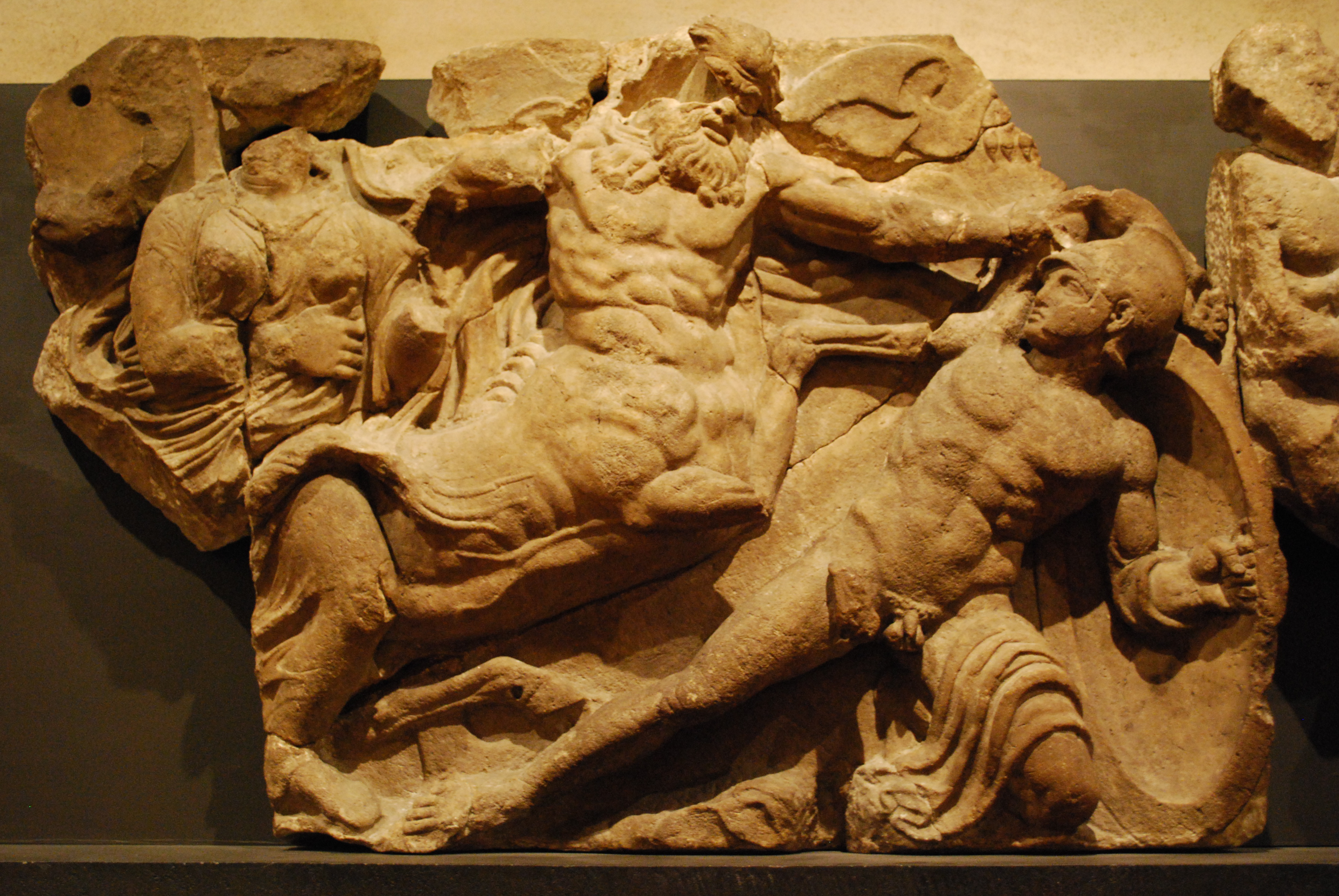
The Bassae Frieze has its own room at the British Museum.

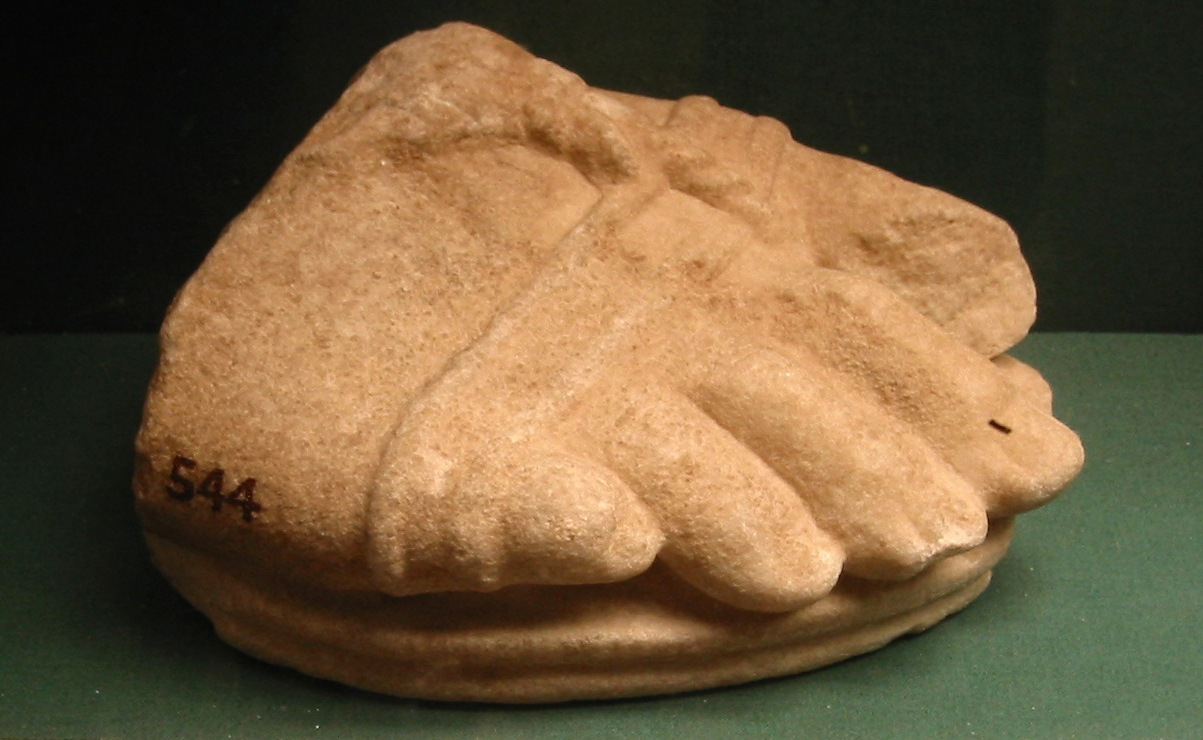
Foot fragment of a colossal statue at Bassae, displayed at the British Museum

The temple had been noticed first in November 1765 by the French architect J. Bocher, who was building villas at Zante and came upon it quite by accident; he recognised it from its site, but when he returned for a second look, he was murdered by bandits. Charles Robert Cockerell and Carl Haller von Hallerstein, having secured sculptures at Aegina, hoped for more successes at Bassae in 1811; all Haller's careful drawings of the site were lost at sea, however.

In 1812, international antiquaries explored the remains and took sculptures including 23 slabs from the Ionic cella frieze to Zante. They had been given permission to explore by Veli Pasha, the Ottoman governor of the Peloponnese, who was bribed to relinquish his claim on the finds, and the frieze was bought at auction by the British Museum in 1815. This frieze's metopes were removed personally by Cockerell. The frieze sculptures were published in Rome in 1814 and officially, by the British Museum in 1820. Other hasty visits resulted in further publications. The first fully published excavation was not begun until 1836; it was carried out by Russian archaeologists, among which the painter Karl Bryullov. Perhaps the most striking discovery was the oldest Corinthian capital found to date. Some of the recovered artefacts are on display at the Pushkin Museum of Fine Arts in Moscow.

In 1902, a systematic excavation of the area was carried out by the Greek Archaeological Society of Athens under archaeologist Konstantinos Kourouniotis along with Konstantinos Romaios and Panagiotis Kavvadias. Further excavations were carried out in 1959, 1970 and from 1975 to 1979, under the direction of Nikolaos Gialouris.

=== Preservation ===
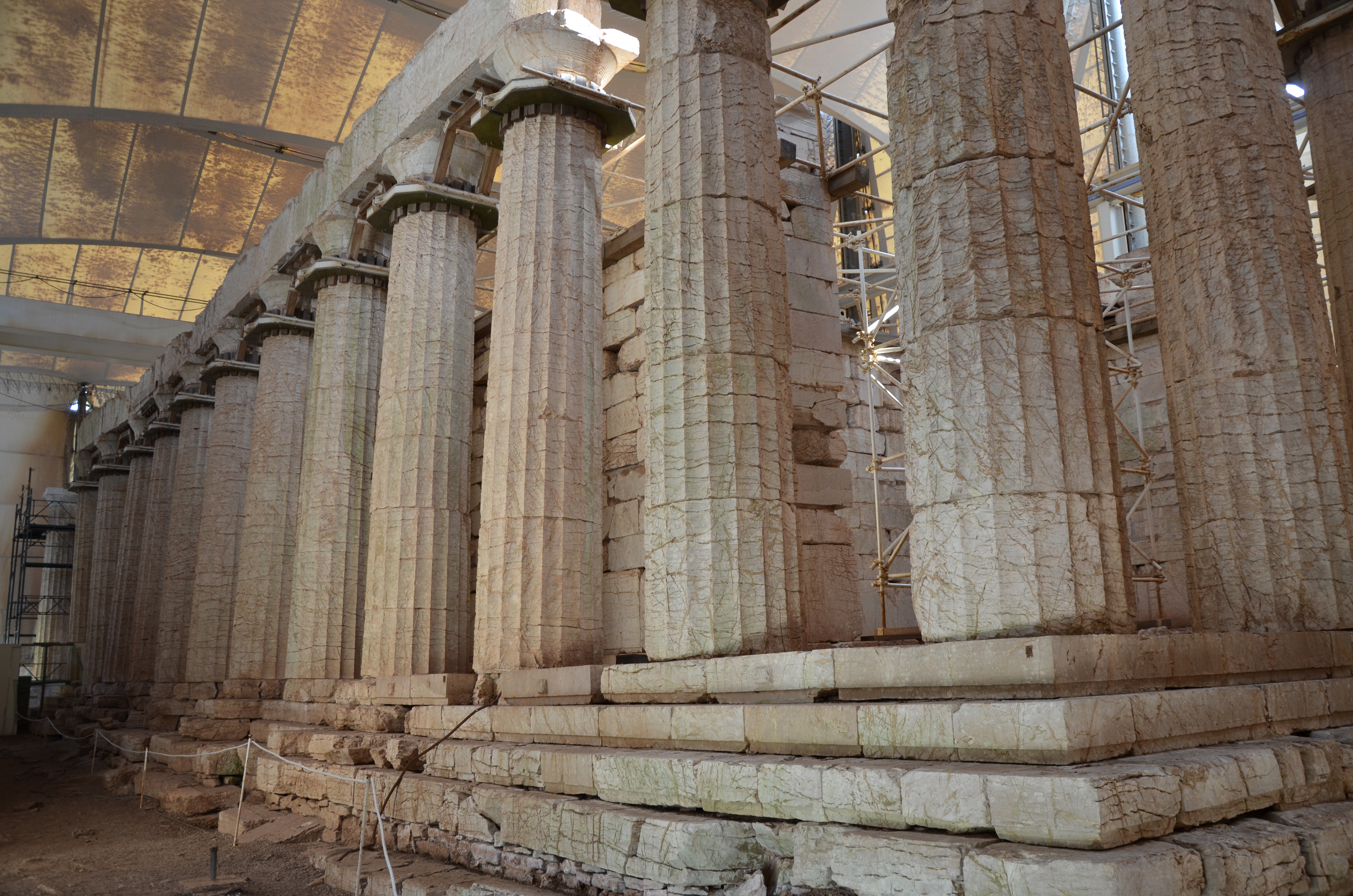
Partial view of the temple under restoration

The temple's remoteness — Pausanias is the only ancient traveller whose remarks on Bassae have survived — has worked to its advantage for its preservation. Other, more accessible temples were damaged or destroyed by war or preserved only by conversion to Christian uses; the Temple of Apollo escaped both these fates. Due to its distance from major metropolitan areas it also has less of a problem with acid rain which quickly dissolves limestone and damages marble carvings.

The temple of Apollo is presently covered in a white tent in order to protect the ruins from the elements. Conservation work is currently being carried out under the supervision of the Committee for the Conservation of the Temple of Apollo Epikourios of the Greek Ministry of Culture, which is based in Athens.

== See also ==
- List of Ancient Greek temples
- Architecture of Ancient Greece
- List of Greco-Roman roofs
