= Aristeides Basiakos =

Greek politician

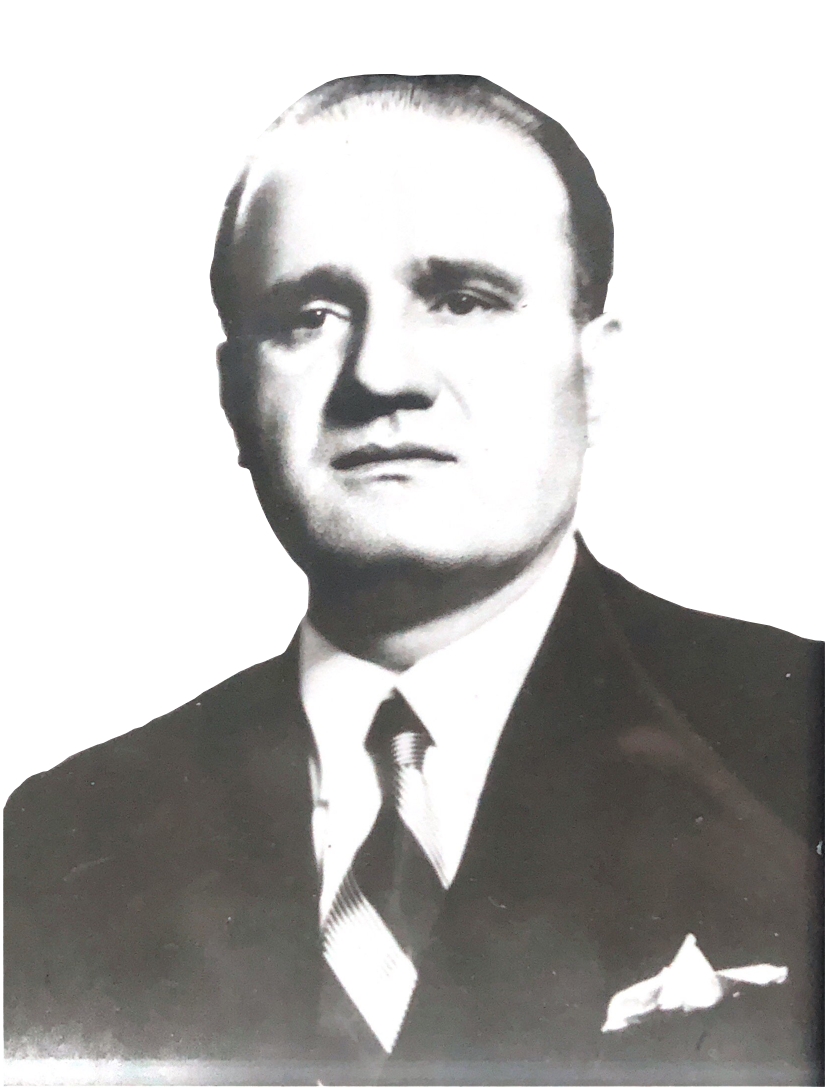

Governor-General of Northern Greece
- In office 19 September 1947 – 7 May 1948
- Prime Minister: Themistoklis Sofoulis
- Preceded by: Konstantinos Rodopoulos
- Succeeded by: Konstantinos Korozos

MP of the Hellenic Parliament
- In office 5 March 1933 – 4 August 1936
- In office 31 March 1946 – 5 March 1950
- In office 29 October 1961 – 3 November 1963

Personal details
- Born: 17 July 1902 Thebes, Greece
- Died: 29 June 1981 (aged 78) Thebes, Greece
- Party: People's Party (Greece) (1933–1961); National Radical Union (1961–1963)
- Relatives: Evangelos Basiakos (nephew)
- Profession: Lawyer

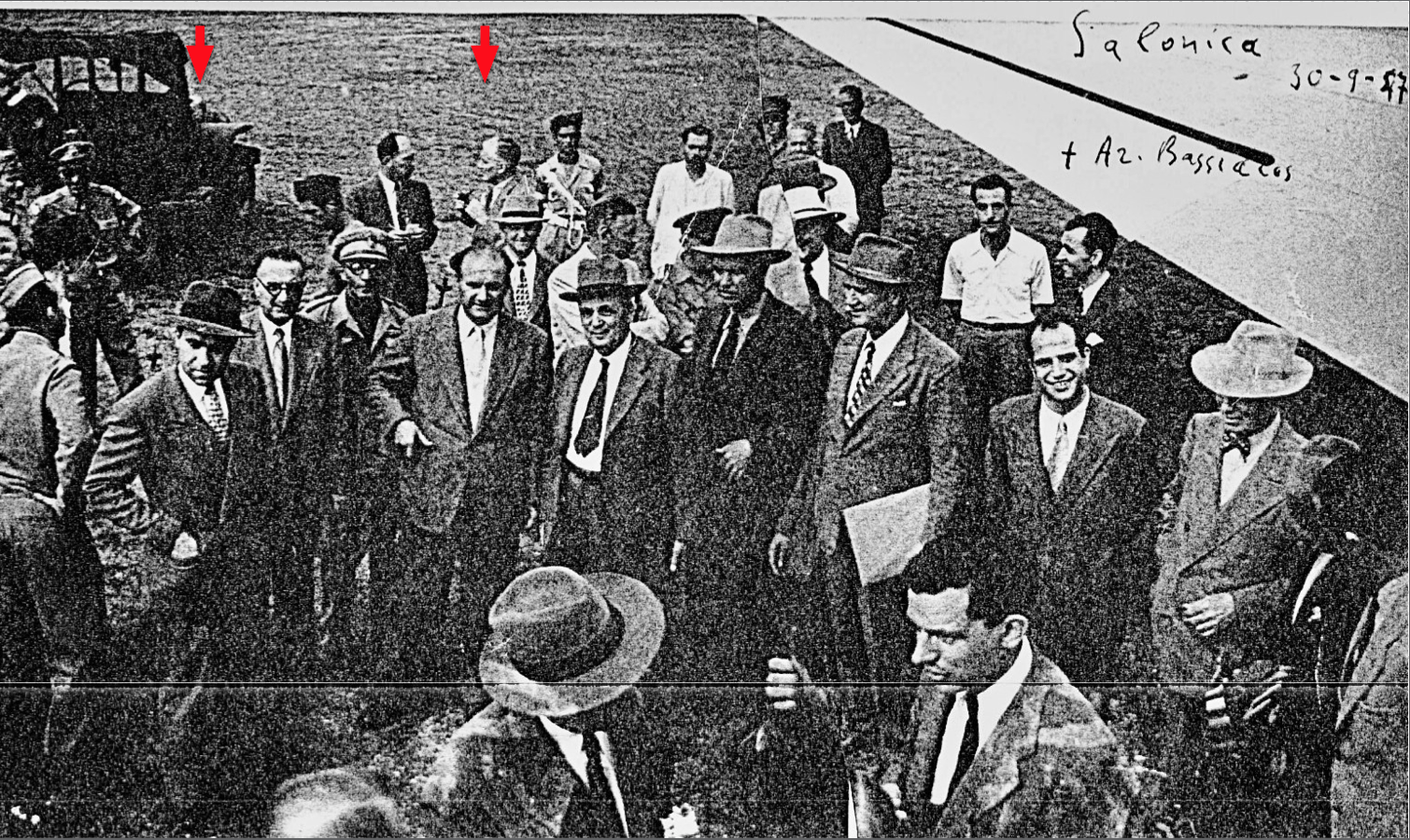
Aristeides Basiakos with the 37th President of the United States, Richard M. Nixon in Thessaloniki (30 September 1947)

Aristides Basiakos (or Aristeidis Bassiakos) of Evangelos (17 July 1902 – 29 June 1981) was a Greek lawyer and politician. He served for years as an MP for the region of Boeotia and Governor-General of Northern Greece in the 1947 Sofoulis cabinet.

== Biography ==
Born in Thebes. He studied and practiced law.

He was elected for the first time as MP in the Fourth National Assembly at Argos. In the 1933 Greek legislative election and the 1936 Greek legislative election he was elected MP of Attica and Boeotia with the People's Party.

He was re-elected as MP for Attica and Boeotia in the 1946 Greek legislative election and in 1961 Greek legislative election with the National Radical Union.

He served as Governor-General of Northern Greece in the 1947 Sofoulis cabinet from 19 September 1947 until 7 May 1948.

His brother, Athanasios Basiakos was married to Aikaterini Basiakou, who died in October 2013.

His nephew, Evangelos Basiakos, later became MP with New Democracy. He served as Minister for Agricultural Development and Food in the First Cabinet of Kostas Karamanlis from 2004 to 2007. He had a son with Vikentia Syropoulou, Athanasios-Aristides Basiakos, who took the name of Aristides Basiakos for honorary and historical reasons.

He died on 29 June 1981 and his funeral took place the next day in the Church of Saint George in Thebes.
