= Stemnitsa Silver-Gold Smithery School =

Design school in Greece

The Stemnitsa Silver-Gold-Smithery School (Greek: Σχολή Αργυροχρυσοχοΐας Στεμνίτσας, Scholi Argyrochrysochoias Stemnitsas) is a publicly funded school where students learn to craft jewelry from silver and gold, hence its name. It is located in Stemnitsa, Arcadia, in southern Greece. The school was established in the 1970s, with its first director being Lambis Katsoulis.
