= Pavlia =

Pavlia Παύλια
- Community
- Location within Greece
- Coordinates: 37°29′N 22°8′E
- Country: Greece
- Administrative region: Peloponnese
- Regional unit: Arcadia
- Municipality: Gortynia
- Municipal unit: Trikolonoi

Population (2021)
  - Community: 52
- Time zone: UTC+2 (EET)
  - Summer (DST): UTC+3 (EEST)
- Vehicle registration: TP

Pavlia (Greek: Παύλια) is a mountain village in the municipal unit of Trikolonoi, Arcadia, Greece. It is located at 700 m elevation on a mountain slope, overlooking the plain of Megalopoli. It is 2 km east of Palamari, 2 km west of Palaiomoiri, 4.5 km west of Lykochia, 9 km southeast of Stemnitsa and 14 km north of Megalopoli. The location of the ancient city Thyraion has been identified with that of the present village Pavlia.

== Population ==
Year	Village population
1981	194
1991	106
2001	105
2011	55
2021	52

== See also ==
- List of settlements in Arcadia
