= Zoeteus =

In Greek mythology, Zoeteus (Ancient Greek: Ζοιτεύς; Zoh-eh-TEE-us or Zoh-EE-teus) was a member of the Arcadian royal family, as the son of Prince Tricolonus, son of the impious King Lycaon. He was the elder brother of Paroreus. Zoeteus was the reputed founder of Zoetia, a town in Arcadia.
