= Spyros Markezinis =

Prime Minister of Greece in 1973

Spyridon Markezinis
- Σπυρίδων Μαρκεζίνης
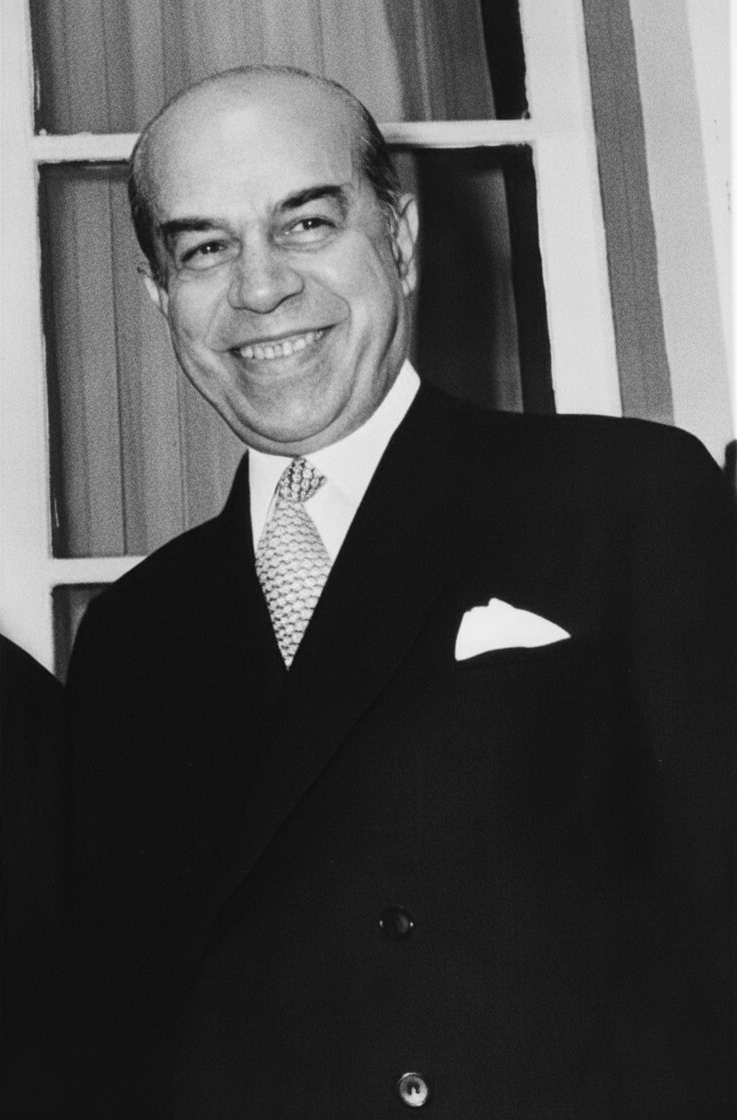
- Markezinis in 1973

Prime Minister of Greece
- In office 8 October 1973 – 25 November 1973
- President: Georgios Papadopoulos
- Preceded by: Georgios Papadopoulos
- Succeeded by: Adamantios Androutsopoulos

Personal details
- Born: 22 April 1909 Athens, Kingdom of Greece
- Died: 4 January 2000 (aged 90) Athens, Greece
- Party: New Party (1947–1951); Progressive Party (1954–1967, 1979–1984)
- Children: Basil Markesinis

Spyridon "Spyros" Markezinis (or Markesinis; Greek: Σπυρίδων Μαρκεζίνης; 22 April 1909 – 4 January 2000) was a Greek politician, longtime member of the Hellenic Parliament, and briefly the Prime Minister of Greece during the aborted attempt at metapolitefsi (democratization) of the Greek military regime in 1973.

== Early political life ==
Spyros Markezinis was born in Athens, a scion of an old wealthy family of Santorini, who were at some time given the title marchesini (i.e., "little Marquesses") during Venetian rule. He earned degrees in Law and Political Science at the University of Athens, and entered private law practice. In 1936, he was appointed counsel to King George II, a capacity in which he served until 1946. The outbreak of World War II and Greece's occupation by Nazi Germany forced the King to flee the country, while Markezinis remained to fight as part of the resistance militias.

Markezinis was elected in the Parliament (the Voulí) during the 1946 elections as a member of the United Nationalist Party from the Cyclades. Shortly thereafter, he left the party and founded the New Party, the second of many parties under which he would serve. The New Party won 2.5% of the vote in the 1950 parliamentary elections, enough for a single seat (held by Andreas Stratos) in the new parliament.

== Economic reform ==
In 1949, Markezinis was appointed minister without portfolio, but was effectively assigned control over the government's economic policy, coordinating the activities of the various economic ministries. Upon the election of long-time ally Marshal Alexandros Papagos as prime minister in 1952, Markezinis's effective position as minister of finance was further strengthened.

In April 1953, Markezinis orchestrated a 50% devaluation of the Greek drachma vis-à-vis the US dollar, concurrently curbing import restrictions. Markezinis’s effective monetary policies are credited for boosting exports and consumer demand, as well as for curtailing inflation and the balance of trade deficit. Markezinis was considered at the time as a possible successor in the party leadership and premiership in the event of Marshal Papagos's retirement.

== Later parliamentary positions ==
Papagos died in 1955. He was succeeded by neither Markezinis (whose relations with the Marshal had become tense) nor by other heirs apparent (such as Panagiotis Kanellopoulos nor Stephanos Stephanopoulos), but by Konstantinos Karamanlis, a junior minister who was appointed by King Paul to form a new government. Karamanlis managed to gather the support of nearly all the MPs of Marshal Papagos's party, and eventually formed the conservative National Radical Union (ERE). In the same year, Markezinis founded the Progressive Party, but failed to win seats in the 1956 elections. Markezinis’s Party eventually won a seat in parliament in the 1958 elections. In 1961, he was re-elected in coalition with the Center Union, as well as in 1964, in coalition with the National Radical Union. Years of political turmoil ensued, and culminated in a military coup on 21 April 1967, orchestrated by Georgios Papadopoulos, which resulted in a 7-year military regime.

== Premiership under the dictatorship ==
In 1973, the predominantly royalist Hellenic Navy staged an abortive attempt to overthrow the military regime. Junta strongman Papadopoulos retaliated by deposing the already self-exiled King Constantine II, and appointing himself President of the Republic further to a controversial referendum.

In face of growing difficulties with the economy, popular dissent and increasing diplomatic isolation, the Greek junta was seeking ways for a transition to some form of parliamentary rule. Papadopoulos sought support from the old political establishment, and Markezinis accepted to undertake the mission to help lead the country back to parliamentary rule in a process that was called metapolitefsi.

In September 1973, he was appointed by Papadopoulos as Prime Minister of Greece, with the task to lead Greece to parliamentary rule. He accepted the task, subject to a commitment by Papadopoulos to curtail any military interference. Papadopoulos proceeded to abolish martial law, and eased censorship of the press. Free elections were promised, in which political formations including part of the traditional left-of-centre were expected to participate.

However, the Communist Party of Greece (KKE), banned since the Greek Civil War, and United Democratic Left (EDA), the party which mostly fronted for KKE during the years of democratic rule, were not expected to be re-legitimised or allowed to participate. In any case, most leading politicians of the old guard refused to participate in any contacts with the ruling junta, insisting on an unconditional and immediate reinstatement of democratic rule.

In November 1973, the Athens Polytechnic uprising broke out. The student protests in front of the Polytechnic evolved into a clearly political, quite vocal and rather widespread, albeit peaceful, rebellion against the dictatorship. After approximately three days and nights of continuous mass gatherings in front of the Polytechnic, the protests were put down by force, through the use of tanks and army units which stormed the building during the night of 17 November. On 25 November, Taxiarkhos Dimitrios Ioannides used the events as a pretext to stage a countercoup that overthrew Papadopoulos. Ioannidis arrested Markezinis, cancelled the elections, and fully reinstated martial law. His regime crumbled in July 1974, after the coup against Makarios III by the Greek junta of Ioannidis which led to the Turkish invasion of Cyprus.

== The restoration of democracy ==
Markezinis was involved in the negotiations in July 1974 that led to the return of democratic government under Karamanlis's national unity government. Markezinis's Progressive Party remained an active political party, albeit a small one, whose main success consisted of electing a delegate to the European Parliament in 1981. Markezinis spent his latter years writing his memoirs and on the political history of contemporary Greece.

== See also ==
- Basil Markesinis

Political offices
Preceded by Georgios Papadopoulos	Prime Minister of Greece; 1973	Succeeded by Adamantios Androutsopoulos
