= Palamari =

Palamari Παλαμάρι
- Community
- Location within Greece
- Coordinates: 37°29′N 22°7′E
- Country: Greece
- Administrative region: Peloponnese
- Regional unit: Arcadia
- Municipality: Gortynia
- Municipal unit: Trikolonoi

Population (2021)
  - Community: 44
- Time zone: UTC+2 (EET)
  - Summer (DST): UTC+3 (EEST)
- Vehicle registration: TP

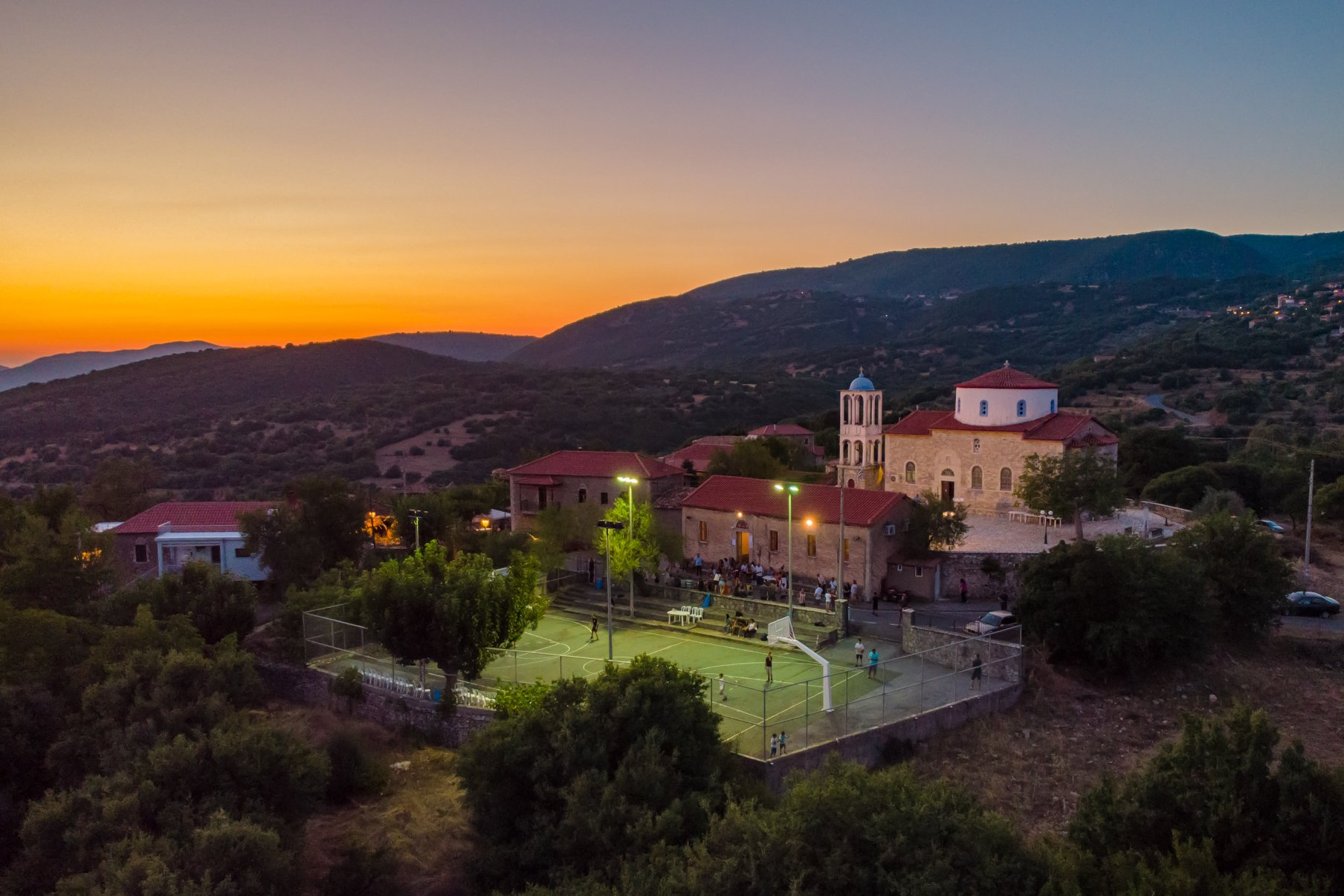
Palamari, Arcadia c.2025

Palamari (Greek: Παλαμάρι) is a mountain village and a community in the municipal unit Trikolonoi, in Arcadia, Greece. It is located on a mountain slope north of the valley of the river Alfeios, at about 700 m elevation. It is 2 km west of Pavlia, 7 km east of Karytaina, 8 km southeast of Stemnitsa and 10 km north of Megalopoli. The community includes the village Psari. The site of the ancient town of Thyraeum is located nearby.

== Population ==
Year	Village population	Population community
1981	-	203
1991	42	-
2001	46	141
2011	15	66
2021	15	44

== See also ==
- List of settlements in Arcadia
