= Zoetia =

Coordinates: 37°27′40″N 22°07′12″E

Zoetia or Zoitia (Ancient Greek: Ζοιτία), or Zoetea or Zoitea (Ζοιτέα), also known as Zoeteium or Zoiteion (Ζοίτειον), was a town of ancient Arcadia, Greece, in the region of Eutresia. According to Greek mythology, the settlement was founded by Zoeteus (Ζοιτεύς), a son of Tricolonus, a relative of Lycaon.

Paroreus (Παρωρεὺς) the youngest son of Tricolonus founded the city of Paroria which was 10 stadia (1.8 km) from Zoetia. When Pausanias visited the city in the 2nd century, it was already abandoned. There remained a temple of Demeter and Artemis then.

Its site is located near the modern Zoni.
