= New Party (Greece, 1947) =

New Party Νέο Κόμμα
- Founder: Spyros Markezinis
- Founded: 1947
- Dissolved: 1951
- Split from: People's Party
- Merged into: Greek Rally
- Ideology: National conservatism Royalism; Nationalism
- Political position: Right-wing

New Party (Greek: Νέο Κόμμα) is a former Greek conservative political party founded in 1947 by Spyros Markezinis. The party was formed after Spyros Markezinis broke away from the People's Party. Eighteen MPs joined the newformed party, mainly from the People's Party.

In the 1950 Greek legislative election the party elected only one MP, Andreas Stratos. Consequently, in August 1951, the party merged into Greek Rally of Marshal Alexandros Papagos.
