= Adamantios Androutsopoulos =

Lawyer and professor (1919–2000)

- Αδαμάντιος Ανδρουτσόπουλος
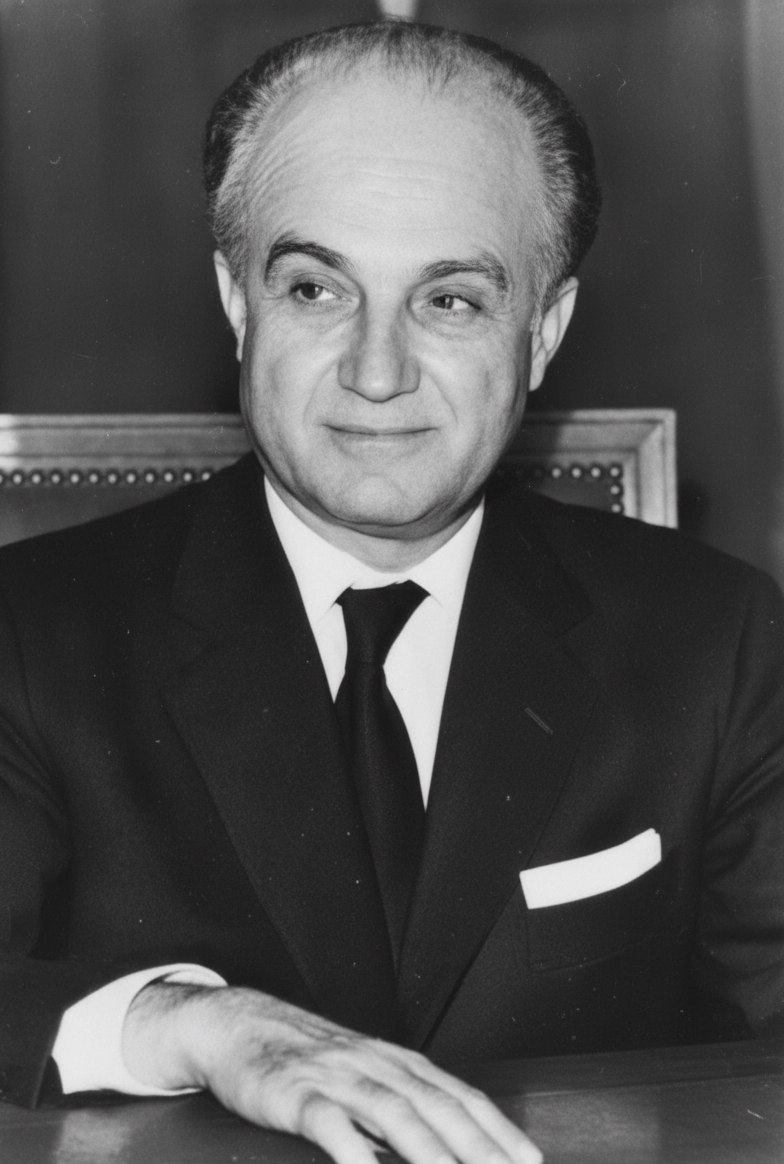
- Androutsopoulos in 1973

Prime Minister of Greece
- In office 25 November 1973 – 23 July 1974
- President: Phaedon Gizikis
- Preceded by: Spyros Markezinis
- Succeeded by: Konstantinos Karamanlis

Minister of the Interior
- In office 26 August 1971 – 10 May 1973
- Prime Minister: Georgios Papadopoulos
- Preceded by: Stylianos Pattakos
- Succeeded by: Stylianos Pattakos

Minister of Finance
- In office 25 November 1973 – 26 July 1974
- Prime Minister: Himself
- Preceded by: Ioannis Koulis
- Succeeded by: Yiangos Pesmazoglou
- In office 21 April 1967 – 26 August 1971
- Prime Minister: Konstantinos Kollias; Georgios Papadopoulos
- Preceded by: Konstantinos Papakonstantinou
- Succeeded by: Ioannis Koulis

Personal details
- Born: 20 August 1919 Psari, Messenia, Greece
- Died: 10 November 2000 (aged 81) Athens, Greece
- Occupation: Lawyer

Adamantios Androutsopoulos (Greek: Αδαμάντιος Ανδρουτσόπουλος; 20 August 1919 – 10 November 2000) was a lawyer and professor. He held various ministerial posts under the Greek military junta of 1967–1974 and was finally appointed interim Prime Minister of Greece from 1973 to 1974 by junta strongman Dimitrios Ioannides. He was the last Prime Minister appointed under the junta before the 1974 general election that marked a return to civilian rule.

He was born in Psari, Messenia, Greece in 1919. He studied at the University of Athens and at the University of Chicago. He never graduated from Chicago but graduated from John Marshall Law School. He was Finance Minister (21 April 1967 – 26 August 1971) and Minister for the Interior (26 August 1971 – 10 May 1973) during the Papadopoulos military régime. When Papadopoulos was overthrown in 1973 by Ioannides, Androutsopoulos was appointed Head of Government (25 November 1973 – 23 July 1974), and also Finance Minister (25 November 1973 – 26 July 1974), until the return of democratic government in 1974 during the Metapolitefsi.

Political offices
Preceded by Spyros Markezinis	Prime Minister of Greece; 25 November 1973 – 23 July 1974	Succeeded by Konstantinos Karamanlis
