= Ano Dorio =

Ano Dorio Άνω Δώριο
- Community
- Location within Greece
- Coordinates: 37°20′N 21°51′E
- Country: Greece
- Administrative region: Peloponnese
- Regional unit: Messenia
- Municipality: Oichalia
- Municipal unit: Dorio

Population (2021)
  - Community: 114
- Time zone: UTC+2 (EET)
  - Summer (DST): UTC+3 (EEST)

Ano Dorio (Greek: Άνω Δώριο) is a mountain-top village in Messenia, Greece. Ano Dorio is close to the larger village of Dorio, and has a population of 114 (2021 census). Since the 2011 local government reform, it is a community within the municipality Oichalia. Ano Dorio used to be known as, and is still referred to by many locals as, Ano Soulima (Greek: Άνω Σουλιμά, which comes from local "Sull i madh", meaning, "Taller Suli") - named after the Souliotes who settled there from northern Greece.

An essay posted on the website of the town's school describes the participation of the town locals, led by their priest, Dimitrios Papatsoris, in the Greek War of Independence.
