= Tricoloni =

Town in ancient Arcadia

Coordinates: 37°28′19″N 22°10′23″E

Tricoloni or Trikolonoi (Ancient Greek: Τρικόλωνοι) was a town in ancient Arcadia. It was part of the Eutresia region. It was situated between Charisia and Zoeteium (Zoetia). According to Pausanias, it was named after its founder Tricolonus.

Its site is located northwest of the modern Karatoulas.
