= Basil Markesinis =

Greek-British barrister and legal scholar (1944–2023)

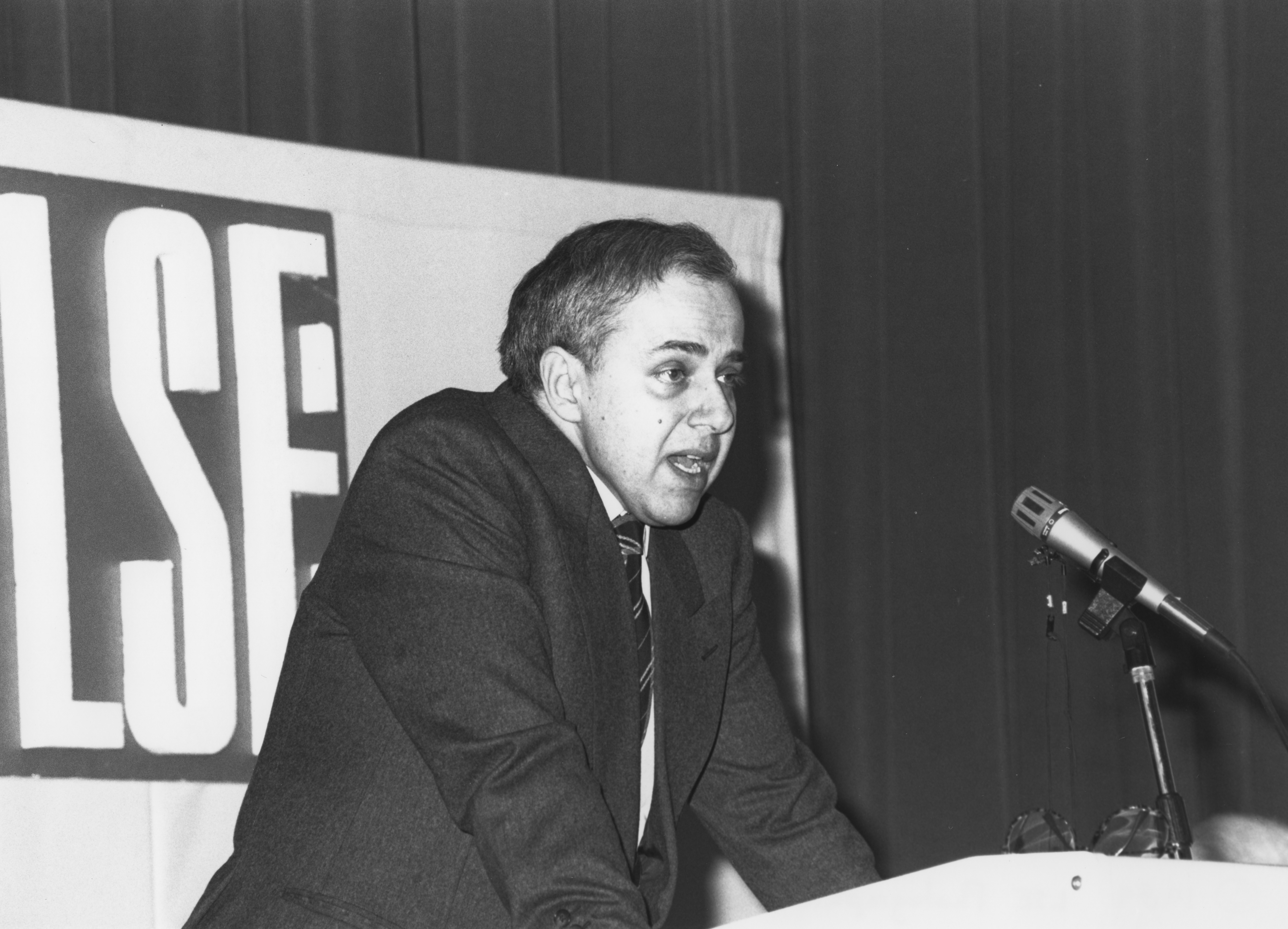
Markesinis in 1989

Sir Basil Markesinis, KC, FBA (Greek: Βασίλειος Μαρκεζίνης; 10 July 1944 – 24 April 2023) was a Greek-British barrister and legal scholar, who was Jamail Regents Professor at the University of Texas, Austin. He was previously Professor of Common and Civil Law at University College London.

== Early life and education ==
Basil Markesinis was born in Athens, Kingdom of Greece on 10 July 1944. He was the son of Greek politician Spyros Markezinis. He held dual British and Greek citizenship. He started his education at the law school of the National and Kapodistrian University of Athens from where he graduated with a first class degree followed by a Doctor Iuris, Athens - "Summa Cum Laude". Sir Basil then went to read law at the University of Cambridge where he earned MA and PhD (York Prize) in 1970. In 1972, he was called to the bar at Gray's Inn, of which he was a Bencher. He took silk, thus becoming a senior barrister, in 2001. Sir Basil was awarded an honorary degree from Cambridge (1988), Gent (1992), Oxford (1995), Paris I (1998), Munich (1999) and Athens (2006).

== Career ==
Markesinis held office as Assistant Professor of Roman and Byzantine Law at the University of Athens (1966–68), Fellow and Director of Studies in Law at Trinity College, Cambridge (1974–1986), Lecturer in the Faculty of Law, University of Cambridge (1978–1986), Denning Professor of Comparative Law at Queen Mary and Westfield College, Professor of European Private Law at University College London, Clifford Chance Professor of European Law and Director of the Institute of European and Comparative Law, and Fellow of Lady Margaret Hall, University of Oxford (1995–1999) and Clifford Chance Professor of Comparative Law and Fellow of Brasenose College.

Other positions included Director and Founder of the Institute of Anglo-American Law, Leiden, member of the Council of Management of the British Institute of International and Comparative Law, member of the Board of Management of the Institute of Advanced Legal Studies, member of the Board of Editors of European Review of Private Law, Revue de droit internationale et de droit comparé, and The Netherlands Journal of International Law.

Markesinis held visiting professorships at Cornell Law School, University of Paris I, Panthéon-Assas University, the University of Michigan Law School, the University of Ghent, and the University of Siena.

Markesinis authored or co-authored thirty books and more than one hundred and twenty articles in languages including English, French, German, and Greek.

== Personal life and death ==
Markesinis was married to Eugenie Trypanis and together they had two children. He died from pneumonia arising from complications of Parkinsonism on 23 April 2023, at the age of 78.

== Honours ==
- Bundesverdienstkreuz, Erste Klass (Officer, Order of Merit), 1991, conferred by the President of the Federal Republic of Germany for the "exceptional merits" of his work on German law and his successful efforts to strengthen Anglo-German relations
- Officier dans l'Ordre des Palmes Académiques (Officer), 1992, awarded by the Prime Minister of France "pour services rendus depuis de nombreuses années à la culture française"
- Chevalier dans l'Ordre National de la Legion d'Honneur, 1995, awarded by President François Mitterrand
- Cavaliere-Ufficiale dell' Ordine al Merito della Repubblica Italiana, 1995, awarded by President Scalfaro "for services to European Integration"
- Grosse Verdienstkreuz (Commander of the Order of Merit, Germany), 1999, conferred by the President of Germany for "outstanding contribution to British-German relations and the promotion of German law"
- Grande Ufficiale dell' Ordine al Merito della Repubblica Italiana (Knight Commander of the Order of Merit), 1999, conferred by President Oscar Luigi Scalfaro
- Commander of the Order of Honour (Greece), 2000, awarded by President Constantine Stephanopoulos for services to the study of Foreign and Comparative law and European legal integration
- Commandeur dans l'Ordre National de la Légion d’Honneur, 2000, awarded by President Jacques Chirac "for exceptional services to France, Europe and the science of Comparative Law"
- Grand Officier dans l'Ordre National de la Légion d'Honneur, 2003, awarded by President Jacques Chirac "pour couronner un des plus grands spécialistes du droit comparé en Europe"
- Cavaliere di Gran Croce dell' Ordine al Merito della Repubblica Italiana (Italy), 2002, awarded by President Carlo Azeglio Ciampi for "services to Comparative Law, Italian Law and European Integration"
- Knight Commander of the Order of Merit (Germany), 2003, awarded by President Johannes Rau for "exceptional services rendered to German-British relations"
- Knight Bachelor (New Year's Honours List, 2005)

=== Other ===
- Fellow, British Academy
- Fellow, Academy of Athens
- Fellow, Institut de France
- Fellow, Royal Belgian Academy
- Foreign Member, Royal Netherlands Academy of Arts and Sciences (since 1995)
- Member, American Law Institute
- Member, Commercial Bar Association
- Member, London Common Law and Commercial Bar Association

== Bibliography ==
1. Σκιές απο την Αμερική. Άρθρα και Δοκίμια πάνω στον Σύγχρονο Αμερικανικό Επεκτατισμό, Εκδοσεις Λιβάνη, 2009 (σελίδες 364) (Greek)

2. Επικοινωνιακή Διπλωματία και Διπλωματία Βάθους, Εκδόσεις Λιβάνη (2009) (σελίδες 317).(in Greek)

3. Το Καλό και το Κακό στην Τέχνη και το Δίκαιο. Ενα Εκτενές Δοκίμιο, Εκδόσεις Λιβάνη (2010) (σελίδες 397). (Greek)

4. Engaging with Foreign Law (co-author), Hart Publishing (2009).

5. The Duality of Genius, Jan Sramek Verlag, illustrated, Vienna (2008) (pages 469)

6. Σκοτεινό Μεγαλείο, Εικονογραφημένο (σελίδες 175), Ελληνικά Γράμματα

7. Good and Evil in Art and Law. An Extended Essay, Springer Verlag, Wien-New York, (2007), 264 pages. [Chinese and Portuguese editions in preparation].

8. Judicial Recourse to Foreign Law: A New Source of Inspiration? (co-author), (Rutledge/ Cavendish Press, 2006) (409 pages).

9. Juges et Universitaires face au droit comparé. Histoire des trente-cinq dernières années, Dalloz (2006) (with a foreword of President Guy Canivet). [French translation of book no 6, below, but up-dated and with an additional chapter on French/USA constitutional law.]

10. The German Law of Contract: A Comparative Treatise, 2nd ed. (co-author) [Completely re-cast and re-written to take into account the recent reform of German Contract Law; 2006, 979 pages plus liv. New edition to appear in 2011]

11. Patterns of Federalism and Regionalism (co-editor), Hart Press (2006) (280 pages).

12. Markesinis and Deakin's Tort Law (co-author), Oxford (6th ed., 2007)

=== Articles ===
- “Weltliteratur and Global Law Lessons from Goethe”, Liber Amicorum for Lord Bingham, Senior Law Lord, Oxford University Press (2009)(reprinted in the Common Law Review (2009)).
- « La politisation de la pensée juridique américaine », Mélanges Geneviève Viney, Dalloz (2008).
- "Human and Divine Justice" 6th Denning Lecture delivered at Lincoln’s Inn and to appear in the forthcoming Liber Amicorum Guido Alpa, Giuffré, Milano, (2007).
- “Political thinking, Human Rights law, and Legal Transplants”, Inaugural address at the University of Athens on the occasion of the award of a Doctorate Honoris Causa by the faculty of Law. (University of Athens, 2007; in Greek).
- “Understanding American Law by Looking at it through Foreign Eyes. Towards a Wider Theory for the Study and Use of Foreign Law”, The Irvine Lecture, Cornell, 22 August 2006 in 81 No 1 Tulane Law Review (2006) ( pp. 123–185).
- “Judicial Mentality: Mental Disposition or Outlook as a Factor Impeding Recourse to Foreign Law”, Centenary Lecture of the Society of Comparative Legislation, 80 Tulane Law Review, Issue 4 (April 2006) (pp1325–1375).
- 41. “Le droit étranger devant le juge américain et le juge français”. Lecture at the Institut de France delivered on 13 March 2006. Institute webpage of that date and (to be reproduced in the Academia Analecta for 2007).41 “National Self- Sufficiency or Intellectual Arrogance? The Current Attitude of American Courts Towards Foreign Law”, The Ninth Peter Taylor Memorial Lecture, Lincoln’s Inn, 2006, 65 No 2, Cambridge Law Journal (2006) pp. 301–329.
- "Die Kunst und die Wissenschaft deutsches Kultur im Ausland zu fördern", Festschrift für Claus-Wilhelm Canaris zum 70. Geburstag, C.H. Beck Verlag
- “Concerns and Ideas about our Developing Law of Privacy (and how Knowledge of Foreign Law Might be of Help)” (co-author); vol: LII The American Journal of Comparative Law, pp. 133– 208 (2004). [Reproduced in website of Institute of Global Law of UCL: www.ucl.ac.uk/laws/global_law/]
- “Case law and Comparative Law: Any Wider Lessons to be Learnt?”, European Review of Private Law (2003).
- “Scholarship, Reputation of Scholarship, and Legacy: Some Provocative Reflections from a Comparatist’s Point of View.” The John Maurice Kelly Memorial Lecture, The Irish Jurist, 2003
- “Caroline of Monaco, Zeta Jones, Naomi Campbell: the private lives of public figures and the Press” Lecture delivered at the Academy of Athens. ( Academia Analecta, 2003.)
- “Liability of Experts in German and American Law: An Exercise in Comparative Methodology” (co-authored), The American Journal of Comparative Law, Autumn issue, 2003
- “Foreign Law Inspiring National Law: Lessons from Greatorex v. Greatorex 61 Cambridge Law Journal, 2002, pp. 386–404.

== See also ==
- Spyros Markezinis
