= Demetrios Sfikas =

Greek revolutionary of the Greek War of Independence

Demetrios Sfikas (Greek:Δημήτριος Σφήκας) was a Greek revolutionary of the Greek War of Independence. He belonged in a well known family of Stemnitsa in Arcadia, which is first referenced in notary acts of the 17th century.

According to his memoirs, with the title "Αναμνήσεις των εν Δακία γεγονότων του 1821" (literally: "Memories of the events in Dacia of 1821"), Demetrios Sfikas, before the Greek war of independence, had served as an executive officer in Bessarabia and with his Stemniote cousin Ilias Migkleris fought in the movement in Dacia. He fought in the revolution in Moldo-Vlachia, appointed by Alexander Ypsilantis as an hekatontarch and leader of a sideguard of 50 horsemen. He took part in the Battle of Skoleni of great importance on July 17, 1821, as well as many military operations in Moldavia.

Demetrios Sfikas followed the footsteps of Fotios Iliadis(died in 1836), a merchant from Dimitsana and member of the Filiki Eteria, and proceeded to London through Russia and Germany where he was taken care of by some "Giannimba" from Valtesiniko of Gortynia, who had been situated for a long time in England and provided for Greeks taking refuge. After the liberation of Greece, Sfikas returned to his birthplace, where he died.

The "Αναμνήσεις των εν Δακία γεγονότων του 1821" ( "Memories of the events in Dacia of 1821") of Demetrios Sfikas that were written after 1835 is a valuable source and have historical value, as they give us firsthand information for the military operations, the events and the heroes of the battle of Skoleni and the unlucky movement in Dacia.
