= Charisia (city) =

City in ancient Arcadia

Charisia (Ancient Greek: Χαρισία), or Charisiae or Charisiai (Χαρισιαί), was a city in ancient Arcadia. It was part of the Eutresia region. Charisia was named after its founder Charisius, a son of Lycaon. It was abandoned when Megalopolis was founded.

It was located 10 stades (2 km) from Scias (itself 13 stades from Megalopolis) and 10 stades from Tricoloni. The location of the ancient city is unknown, it is believed to have been situated in the area of the modern Trilofo.
