= Kato Melpeia =

Kato Melpeia Κάτω Μέλπεια
- Community
- Location within Greece
- Coordinates: 37°20′N 21°56′E
- Country: Greece
- Administrative region: Peloponnese
- Regional unit: Messenia
- Municipality: Oichalia
- Municipal unit: Andania

Population (2021)
  - Community: 188
- Time zone: UTC+2 (EET)
  - Summer (DST): UTC+3 (EEST)

Kato Melpeia (Greek: Κάτω Μέλπεια) is a village and a community located in the municipal unit of Andania in Messenia, Greece. The community, which includes the small settlement of Vrachos, has a population of 188 (2021 census).

The village has a local reputation for fishing trout and a mountain spring known as Koube.
