= Scias =

Ancient settlement in Arcadia, Greece

Scias or Skias (Ancient Greek: Σκιάς) was a settlement in ancient Arcadia. It was mentioned by Pausanias who visited the region in the 2nd century. It was 13 stadia (2 km) from Megalopolis, and 10 stadia from Charisia. Pausanias mentioned the ruins of the temple of Artemis Skiatis. The location of Scias is unknown today.
