= Paroreia (Thrace) =

Paroreia (Ancient Greek: Παρώρεια) was a city of ancient Thrace on the borders of Macedonia. It is called by Stephanus of Byzantium a city of Macedonia. Its inhabitants are mentioned by Pliny the Elder under the name of Paroraei. Its site is unlocated.
