= SKIA College =

Islamic college in Maguindanao del Norte, Philippines

Sultan Kudarat Islamic Academy Foundation College
- Motto: Iqra Bismi Rabbika" (Arabic)
- Motto in English: "Read in the Name of Thy Lord"
- Type: Private, Islamic university
- Established: 2 September 1991
- Religious affiliation: Islam
- Chairman: Tucao Mastura
- President: Michael Mastura
- Location: Maguindanao del Norte, Philippines; 7°13′54″N 124°15′09″E
- Campus: Main campus: Bulalo, Sultan Kudarat, Maguindanao Satellite campus: RH4, Cotabato City
- Colors: Green and white
- Website: www.skia.edu.ph
- Location in Mindanao Location in the Philippines

Sultan Kudarat Islamic Academy Foundation College (abbreviated SKIAFC or simply SKIA) is a non-sectarian private four-year college located in Sultan Kudarat, Maguindanao del Norte. The college's 22-acre (8.8 hectares) site is situated across the Rio Grande de Mindanao.

== History ==
SKIA College was conceived by lawyer Michael O. Mastura, engineer Darwish Al-Gobaishi, and religious leader Salah Muhammad Ali Abdula. It was initially developed as a family-administered madrasah, operated and registered under MECS Order No. 24, s. 1985. It was later incorporated on 2 September 1991 as a non-stock educational foundation.
