= Paroreus =

In Greek mythology, Paroreus (Ancient Greek: Παρωρεὺς) was the youngest son of Tricolonus, son of the impious King Lycaon, and brother of Zoeteus. He was the reputed founder of the Arcadian town of Paroria.
