= Tricolonus =

In Greek mythology, Tricolonus (Ancient Greek: Τρικολώνου, Τρικόλωνον or Τρικολώνῳ, romanized: Trikolonos, lit. 'three-hilled' or 'three-membered') may refer to the following personages:

- Tricolonus, an Arcadian prince as one of the 50 sons of the impious King Lycaon either by the naiad Cyllene, Nonacris or by unknown woman. He was the father of Zoeteus and Paroreus. Tricolonus was the reputed eponymous founder of the Arcadian town of Tricoloni.
- Tricolonus, descendant of the above figure. He was one of the suitors of Hippodamia, daughter of the Pisatian King Oenomaus. Tricolonus suffered the same fate as the other suitors of the princess who were slain by her father-king.
