= Stemnitsa =

Stemnitsa Στεμνίτσα
- Community
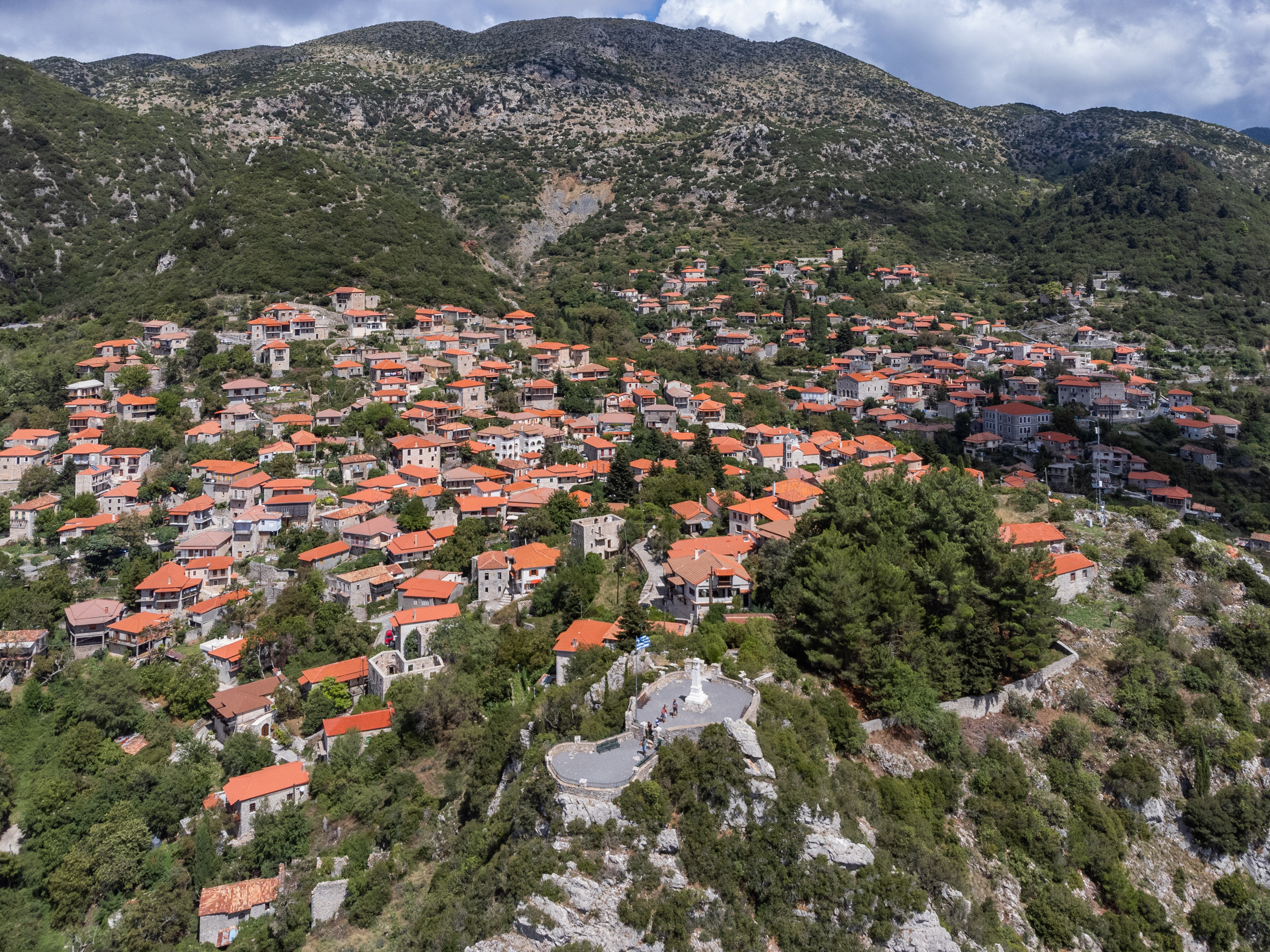
- Aerial view of the village from south

- Location within Greece
- Coordinates: 37°33′N 22°5′E
- Country: Greece
- Administrative region: Peloponnese
- Regional unit: Arcadia
- Municipality: Gortynia
- Municipal unit: Trikolonoi
- Elevation: 1,083 m (3,553 ft)

Population (2021)
  - Community: 319
- Time zone: UTC+2 (EET)
  - Summer (DST): UTC+3 (EEST)
- Postal code: 220 24
- Area code: 27950
- Vehicle registration: TP

Stemnitsa (Greek: Στεμνίτσα) is a mountain village in the municipal unit of Trikolonoi, Arcadia, Peloponnese, Greece. It was the seat of the former municipality Trikolonoi. Stemnitsa is a traditional settlement and is considered one of the most beautiful villages in Arcadia, due to its picturesque location and its historical churches and mansions. It is situated at the western edge of the Mainalo mountains, above the left bank of the river Lousios, at about 1050 m elevation. Stemnitsa is 6 km southeast of Dimitsana, 9 km northeast of Karytaina, 18 km northwest of Megalopoli and 26 km west of Tripoli.

== History and myths ==
Stemnitsa has been identified with the ancient Arcadian city Hypsous (Υψούς). It was already ruined in the 2nd century AD, when it was visited by Pausanias. It was near Thyraion (present Pavlia), Zoetia and Paroria. Hypsous was founded by a son of Lycaon.

In the 7th and 8th century Slavs settled in the Peloponnese. The name Stemnitsa has Slavic roots and means "woodland". After the fall of Constantinople in 1453 the Peloponnese was occupied by the Ottoman Empire. Due to its remote location Stemnitsa served as a relatively safe haven from the Ottomans, and it became a centre of Greek culture and religion. Many old churches from this period have been preserved. The church of Bafero was built in 1185 and the Zoodochos in 1433. The two larger churches are Ai-Giorgis and Agia Paraskevi. The first mention, some say, of the word Stemnitsa, was found in Ottoman taxation documents dated 1512-1515 where the number of families appeared to be about 120. This information was published by professor John Alexandropoulos. In the Grimani Venetian Census report Stemnitsa was shown as the most populous village in Gortynia with 925 people.

Stemnitsa was a shelter for the Kolokotronis clan and other fighters of the Greek War of Independence. After the revolution of March 25, 1821, from the end of May to mid of June 1821, it served as the first seat of the "Peloponissiaki Gerousia", the temporary government of the liberated Peloponnese. The Gerousia met at the monastery of Zoodochos Pigi. Stemnitsa was known for its gold- and silversmiths, as well as other crafts. Since the 1970s, there is a public funded gold and silver smithery school in Stemnista.

== Sights ==
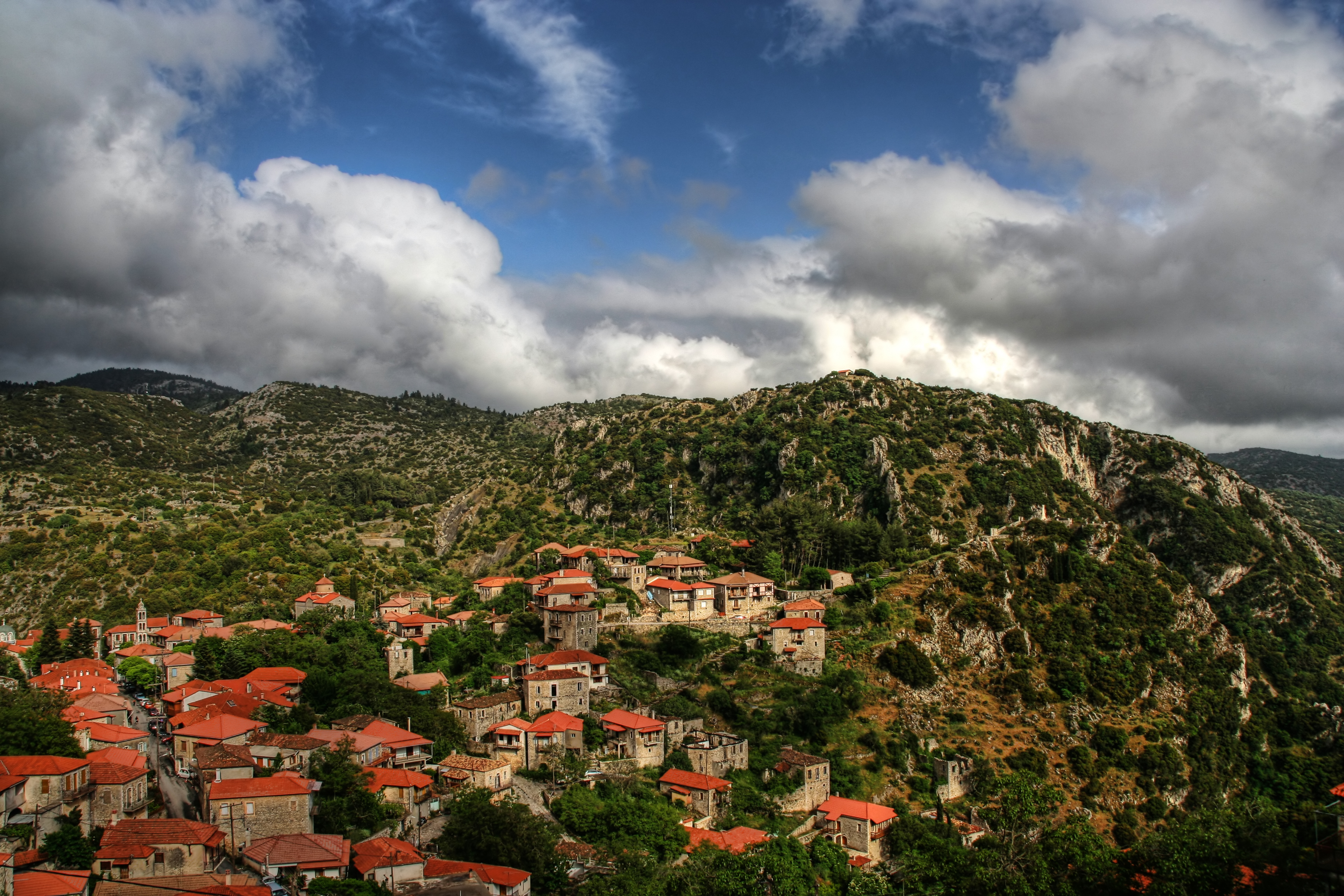
View of Stemnitsa

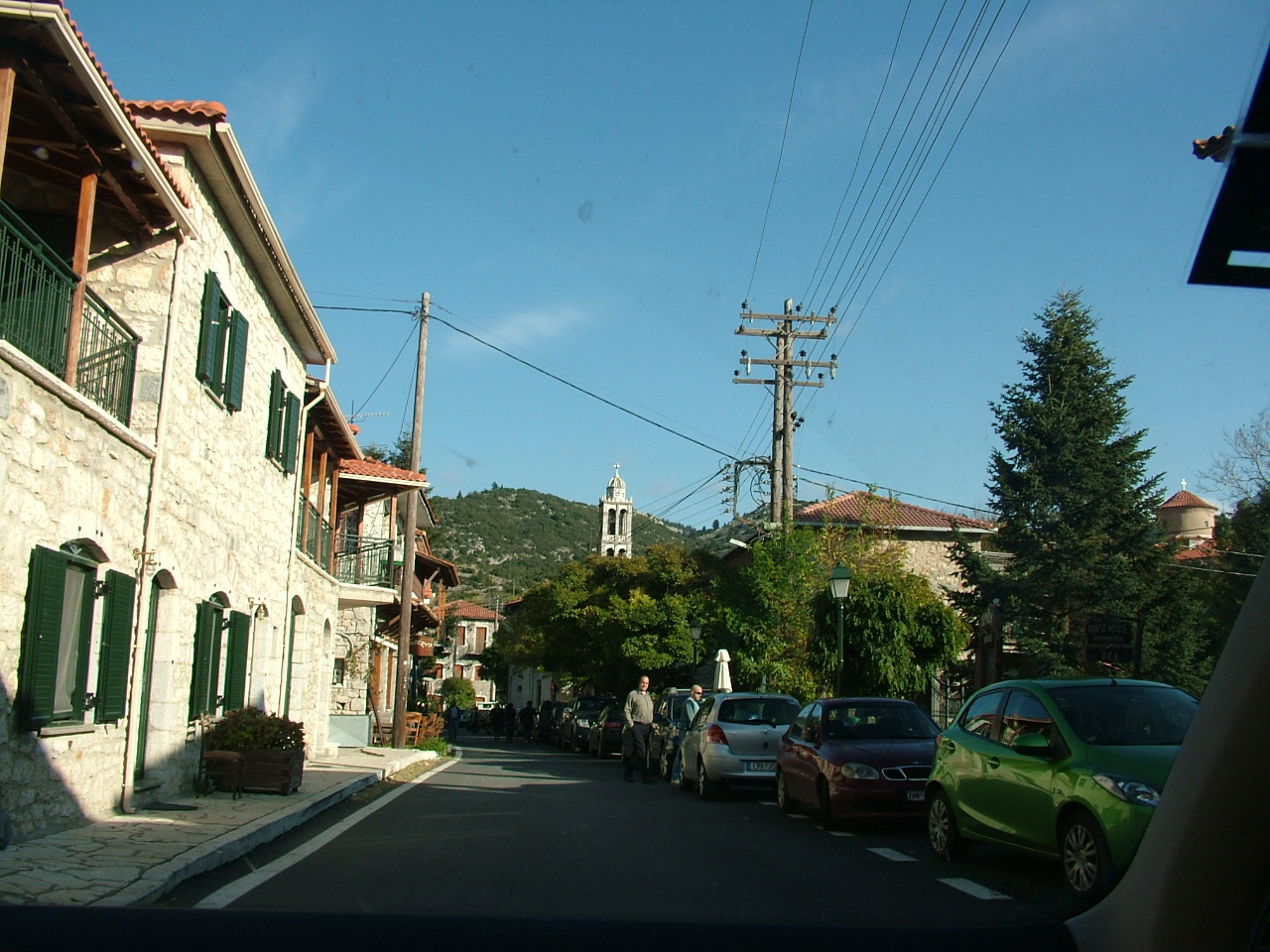
Stemnitsa

Stemnitsa has a folklore museum. It includes various exhibitions regarding the traditional way of Stemnitsa life in the past including how candles were made, a jeweler's workshop, a shoe repair shop and a copper tinning representation. It also houses an extensive selection of Byzantine icons, old costumes, copper- ware, guns and jewelry.

An organization which is responsible for the beautification of Stemnitsa is the Cultural and Beautification Organization "Politistikos kai Exoraistikos Syllogos Stemnitsioton Ypsountas". This organization is also in charge of the local cultural center "The Nikoletopouleion" and of organizing a number of other events which take place during the year, mainly during the months of July and August.

Seven kilometers from Stemnitsa, down by the ravine of the river Lousios one can find the monastery of St. John the Baptist (Prodromos) built, according to some sources, around 1167, on the side of a rock face. It served as a center of faith and education for the enslaved Greeks during the Ottoman rule. About 200 yards below the monastery, is the river Lousios. Near the monastery are the excavations of an ancient hospital built in honor of the ancient Greek god of medicine, Asclepius.

The library of Stemnitsa used to have around 5,000 volumes until the Greek War of Independence of 1821. It is now a monument and is located next to the square.

== Population history ==
Year	Village population	Community population
16th century	925	-
1981	404	-
1991	-	495
2001	412	437
2011	191	191
2021	312	319

== People ==
- Elias Gyftopoulos, Ford Professor Emeritus of Nuclear Engineering and Mechanical Engineering, MIT.
- Gennaios Kolokotronis (1803-1868), Prime Minister of Greece.
- Georgios Roilos (1867-1928), famous painter, among the first to introduce impressionism into Greek painting, Professor at the University of Athens (a teacher and mentor of Giorgio de Chirico).
- Antonis Samaras, Prime Minister of Greece; President of the political party "New Democracy;" former minister of foreign affairs.
- Dimitrios Thanopoulos, silver medal in Greco-Roman wrestling at the 1984 Olympics.

== See also ==
- List of settlements in Arcadia
- List of traditional settlements of Greece
