= Dorio, Messenia =

Dorio Δώριο
- Municipal unit
- Location within the regional unit

- Location within Greece
- Coordinates: 37°17′N 21°54′E
- Country: Greece
- Administrative region: Peloponnese
- Regional unit: Messenia
- Municipality: Oichalia

Area
  - Municipal unit: 102.8 km^{2} (39.7 sq mi)
- Elevation: 170 m (560 ft)

Population (2021)
  - Municipal unit: 1,839
  - Municipal unit density: 17.89/km^{2} (46.33/sq mi)
  - Community: 765
- Time zone: UTC+2 (EET)
  - Summer (DST): UTC+3 (EEST)
- Vehicle registration: ΚΜ

Dorio (Greek: Δώριο) is a village and a former municipality in Messenia, Peloponnese, Greece. Since the 2011 local government reform it is part of the municipality Oichalia, of which it is a municipal unit. The municipal unit has an area of 102.832 km^{2}. The population of the municipal unit is 1,839, and of the village alone 765 (2021 census). Dorio is 170 metres (560 ft) above sea level. The small settlement of Ano Dorio is nearby. Dorio has been mentioned in Homer's Iliad, and by Strabo and Pausanias. Homer recounts a myth that Dorio was the location of a music competition between Thamyris and the Muses.
