= Paroreia (Arcadia) =

Coordinates: 37°29′06″N 22°08′20″E

Paroreia (Ancient Greek: Παρώρεια) or Paroria (Παρωρία) was a town of ancient Arcadia, Greece, in the region of Eutresia. It was located near the present village Palaiomoiri, in the municipality of Megalopoli. According to Greek mythology, Paroreia was founded by Paroreus (Παρωρεὺς), a son of Tricolonus. It was 10 stades from Zoetia, and 4 stades from Thyraeum. It was already abandoned when Pausanias visited the area in the 2nd century.

== See also ==
- List of Ancient Greek cities
