= Eira, Messenia =

Eira Είρα
- Municipal unit
- Location within the regional unit

- Location within Greece
- Coordinates: 37°25′N 21°58′E
- Country: Greece
- Administrative region: Peloponnese
- Regional unit: Messenia
- Municipality: Oichalia

Area
  - Municipal unit: 86.7 km^{2} (33.5 sq mi)

Population (2021)
  - Municipal unit: 295
  - Municipal unit density: 3.40/km^{2} (8.81/sq mi)
- Time zone: UTC+2 (EET)
  - Summer (DST): UTC+3 (EEST)
- Vehicle registration: ΚΜ

Eira (Greek: Είρα) is a former municipality in Messenia, Peloponnese, Greece. Since the 2011 local government reform it is part of the municipality Oichalia, of which it is a municipal unit. The municipal unit has an area of 86.654 km^{2}. Population 295 (2021). The seat of the municipality was in Neda.
