= Oichalia, Messenia =

Oichalia Οιχαλία
- Municipality
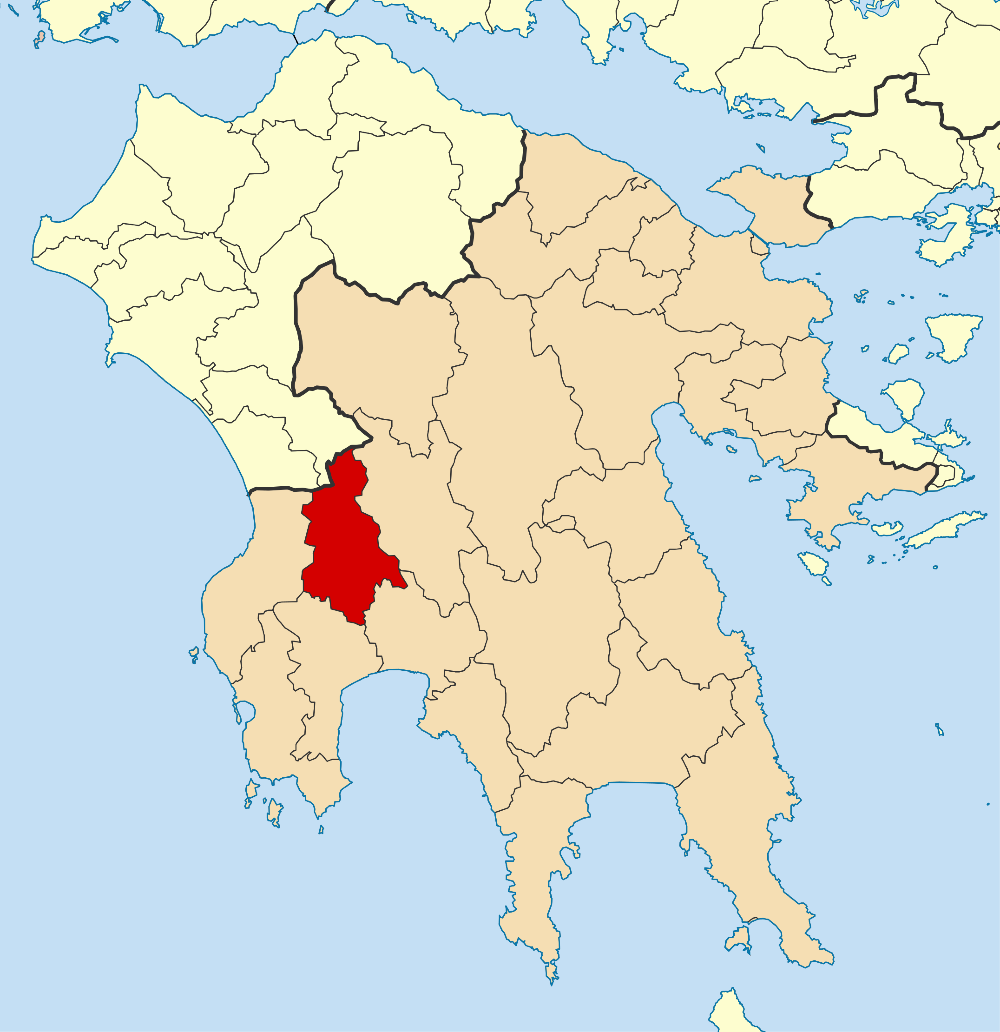

- Location within Greece
- Coordinates: 37°14′N 22°02′E
- Country: Greece
- Administrative region: Peloponnese
- Regional unit: Messenia

Area
  - Municipality: 415.4 km^{2} (160.4 sq mi)
  - Municipal unit: 59.1 km^{2} (22.8 sq mi)

Population (2021)
  - Municipality: 8,504
  - Density: 20.47/km^{2} (53.02/sq mi)
  - Municipal unit: 1,765
  - Municipal unit density: 29.9/km^{2} (77.3/sq mi)
  - Community: 363
- Time zone: UTC+2 (EET)
  - Summer (DST): UTC+3 (EEST)
- Vehicle registration: ΚΜ

Oichalia (Greek: Οιχαλία) is a village and a municipality in Messenia, Greece. The seat of the municipality is in Meligalas. Oichalia is known for its rich expanse of olive trees and fig orchards. At its height the village boasted several cafes, a bustling farmer's market, and a popular open-air cinema run by the Limberopoulos family. Other families, such as the Hantzopoulos and Karbaliotis clans, the former a cobbler and the latter a butcher, helped make Oichalia the destination of choice for Messinians in need of footwear and quality meats.

== Municipality ==
The municipality Oichalia was formed at the 2011 local government reform by the merger of the following 5 former municipalities, that became municipal units:

- Andania
- Dorio
- Eira
- Meligalas
- Oichalia

The municipality has an area of 415.433 km^{2}, the municipal unit 59.060 km^{2}.
