= Skiritida forest =

Forest in Greece

Coordinates: 37°20′00″N 22°23′10″E

Skiritida Forest Δάσος Σκιρίτιδας
- Interactive map of Skiritida Forest

Geography
- Location: Southern Arcadia, Greece
- Area: 50,000 acres (20,000 ha)

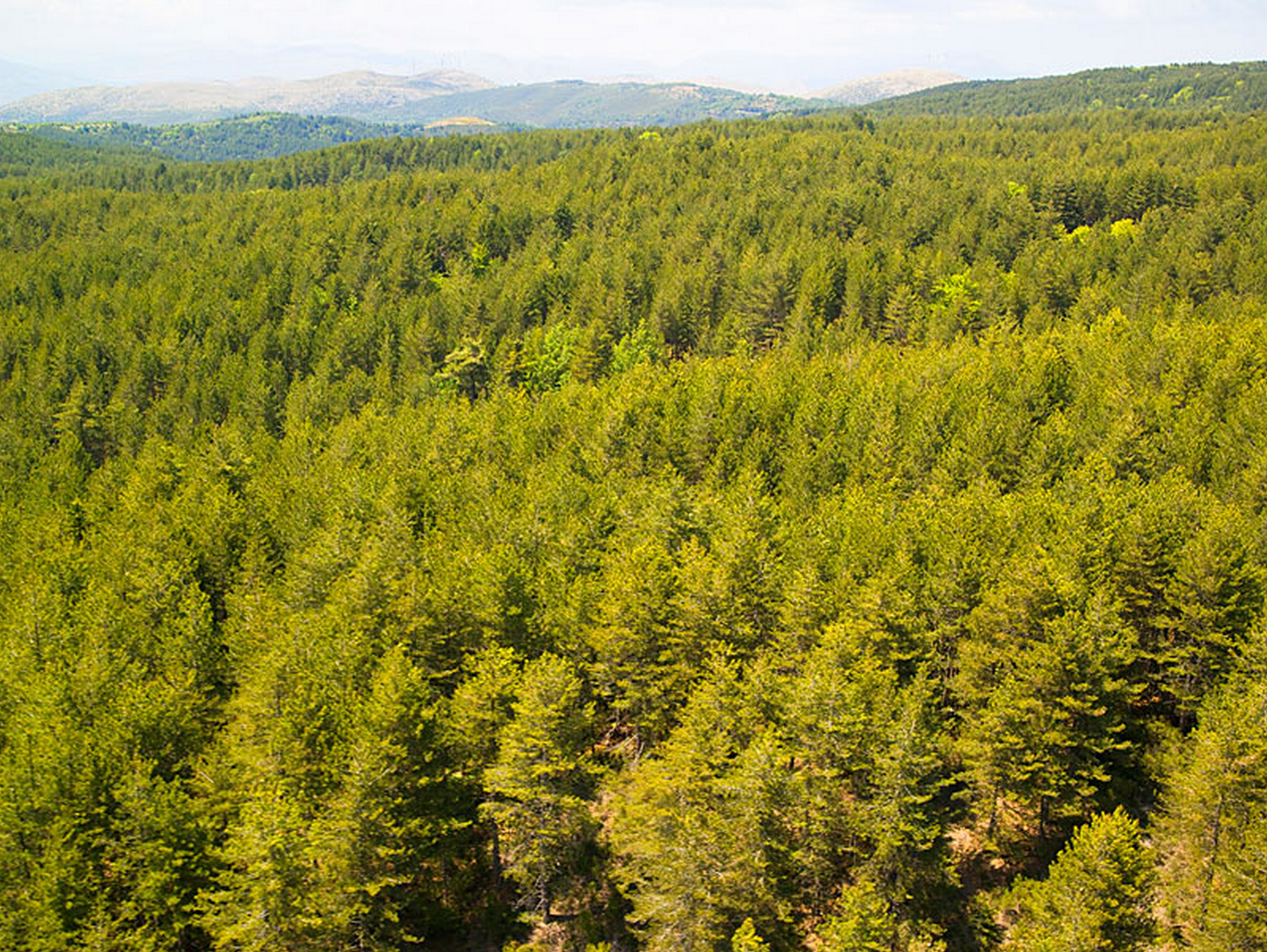
Skiritida forest

Skiritida forest is a forest located in southern Arcadia. It is surrounded by Mainalo mountain to its North, Parnon to its East and the cross between Parnon and Taygetos tο its South. Surroundings villages include: Vlachokerasia, Kerasia, Kaltezes and Kollines.

It was intact until the Greek War of Independence, with age-old oaks and deep ravines, but large fires damaged it. It was later restored with human intervention. Residents of Vlachokerasia, Kerasia and other villages began to reforest the area in the early 20th century. Residents and schools in the area took part in the initiative until a forester, Anastasios Stefanou, undertook a scientific and methodical reforestation. A model park was created with chestnuts and black pine trees. Today, it spreads over 50,000 acres and provides a rich ecosystem.

Evrotas river springs from the forest and flows for 82 kilometers before reaching the Laconian Gulf. A 14 km road path runs through the forest.
