= Agios Petros, Arcadia =

Agios Petros Άγιος Πέτρος
- Community
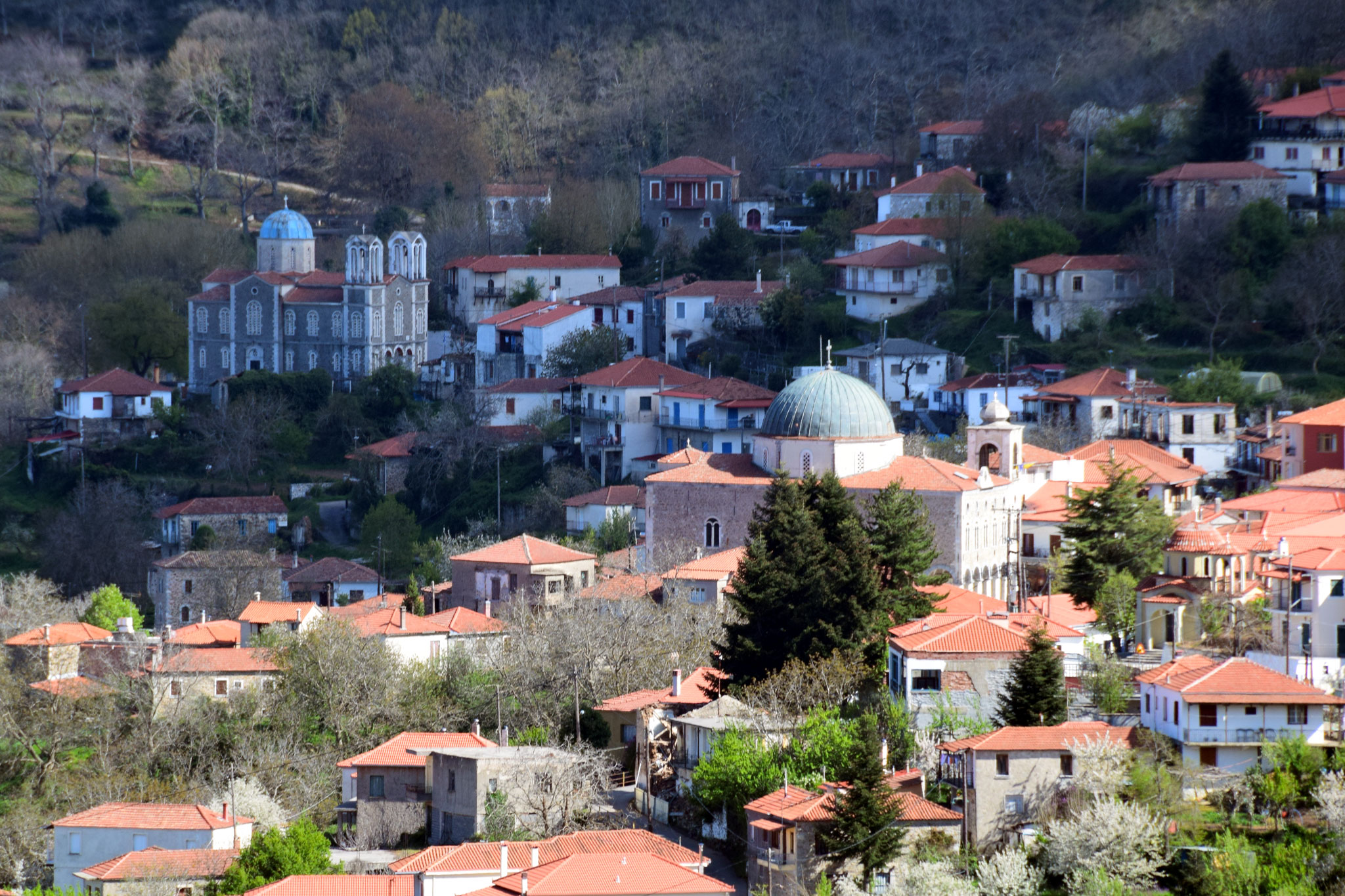

- Location within Greece
- Coordinates: 37°19.7′N 22°32.8′E
- Country: Greece
- Administrative region: Peloponnese
- Regional unit: Arcadia
- Municipality: North Kynouria
- Elevation: 950 m (3,120 ft)

Population (2021)
  - Community: 506
- Time zone: UTC+2 (EET)
  - Summer (DST): UTC+3 (EEST)

Agios Petros (Greek: Άγιος Πέτρος) is a mountain village and a community in the municipality of North Kynouria in southeastern Arcadia, Greece. It is considered a traditional settlement. The community includes the village Xirokampi and the Malevi Monastery. It is situated in the northern part of the Parnon mountains, at about 950 m elevation. It is 3 km south of Elatos, 5 km east of Vourvoura, 6 km northeast of Karyes (Laconia), 18 km southwest of Astros and 26 km southeast of Tripoli.

== Population ==
Year	Population village	Population community
1981	-	1,620
1991	1,234	-
2001	949	1,044
2011	675	717
2021	488	506

== Notable people ==
- Nilus the Myrrh-streamer (1601–1651), an Orthodox Christian saint and ascetic
- George Christopher (1907-2000) Mayor of San Francisco from 1956-1964

== See also ==
- List of settlements in Arcadia
- List of traditional settlements of Greece
