= Tsakonian =

Tsakonian may refer to:

- Tsakonians
- Tsakonian Greek
