= Vlachokerasia =

Human settlement in Greece

Vlachokerasia Βλαχοκερασιά
- Community
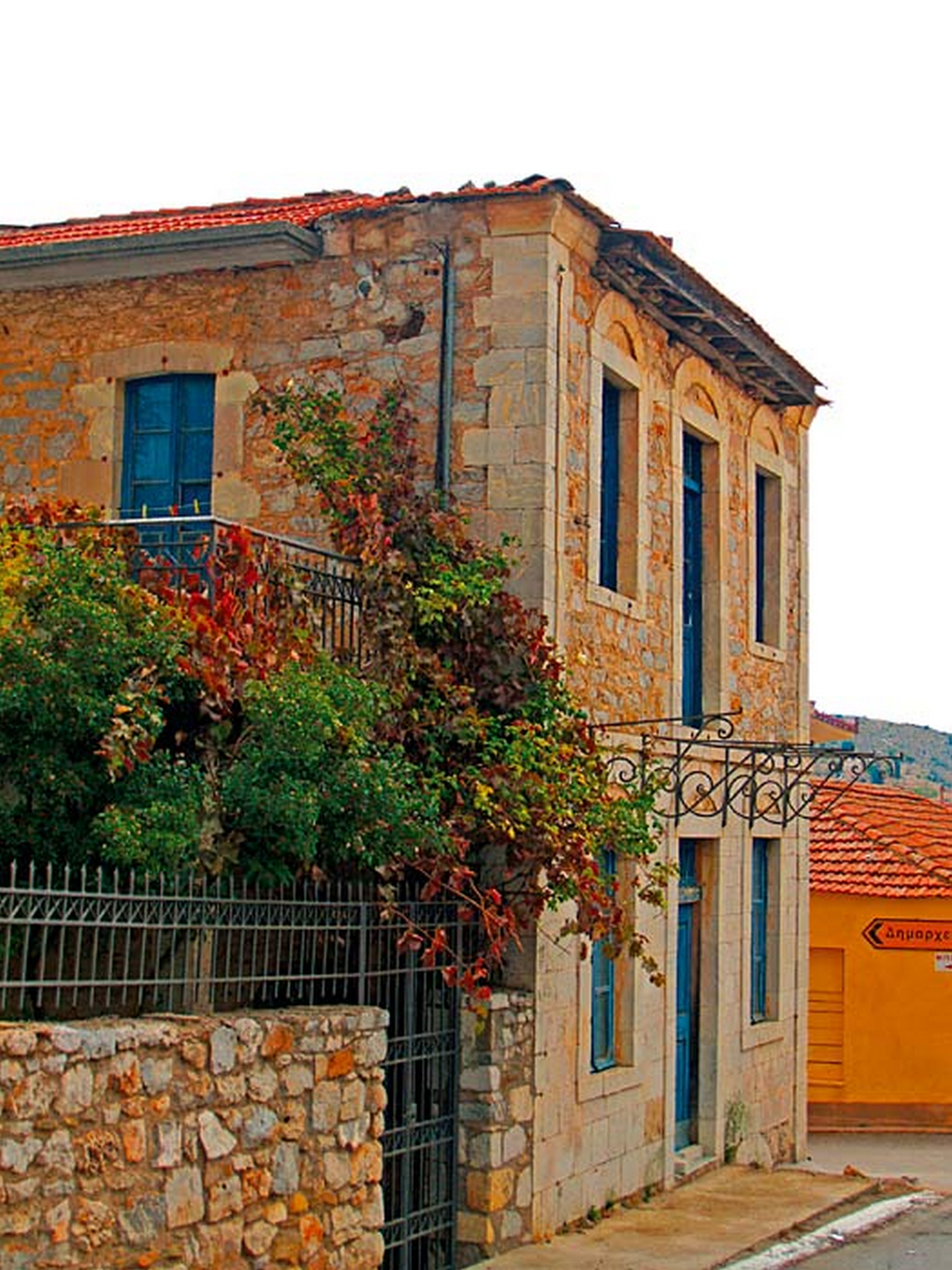
- House in Vlachokerasia

- Location within Greece
- Coordinates: 37°22.05′N 22°22.38′E
- Country: Greece
- Administrative region: Peloponnese
- Regional unit: Arcadia
- Municipality: Tripoli
- Municipal unit: Skiritida
- Elevation: 950 m (3,120 ft)

Population (2021)
  - Community: 385
- Time zone: UTC+2 (EET)
  - Summer (DST): UTC+3 (EEST)
- Postal code: 220 16
- Area code: 271
- Vehicle registration: TP

Vlachokerasia (Greek: Βλαχοκερασιά) is a village in Arcadia, Peloponnese, Greece. According to the 2021 census, it had a population of 385 inhabitants. It is located 22 km from Tripoli and at an altitude of roughly 950 meters, in a region with cherry trees, chestnuts and apple trees, walnuts and plane trees. The numerous water mills serve not only Vlachokerasia but also towns as far as Tegea.

== Toponymy ==
The name Vlachokerasia is a combination of the words Vlach and 'kerasia' (Greek for 'cherry tree'). It is comparable to the nearby village of Kerasia, formerly called Arvanitokerasia (Greek: Αρβανιτοκερασιά), a combination of the words Arvanite and 'kerasia'. Natives refer to Vlachokerasia and Arvanitokerasia as 'western' and 'eastern Kerasia' respectively and some have suggested that the latter part of the name refers to the large amounts of cherry trees found in the area. The name Vlachokerasia is recorded as early as 1583 as Ivlahikerasya.

== History ==
=== Ancient history ===
A town which dates from antiquity, Vlachokerasia was inhabited by the ancient Skiritai, a people dependent on Sparta and somewhat similar in class to the Perioikoi. Historical testimonials attest that the ancient name of the village was Oeum, also known as Oion, Ion, or Ium, (Ancient Greek: Οἰόν, Οἶον, Ἰόν). In war, the Skiritai formed a battalion which fought on the left wing of the Spartan army and, according to the 10th-century Souda consisted of six hundred men, which in wars engaged first and withdrew last. According to Xenophon, the Skiritai had been dependent on Sparta since before the time of Lycurgus. Oeum (modern-day Vlachokerasia), being the primary town of the rugged and mountainous Sciritis district, was located on the road between Sparta and Tegea, and thus was strategically important to the Spartans. The findings of archaeological excavations from the area are housed in the nearby Tegea Museum.

=== Early modern history ===
Through the early modern period the region of Arcadia and Peloponnesus in general was not well documented. Being within Arcadia, Vlachokerasia was under the control of the Despotate of the Morea until its capture by the Ottoman Empire in 1460. In 1661 the peninsula became a province within the empire known as the Eyalet of the Morea. Following the victory of Republic of Venice over the Ottomans in the Morean War in 1688, the peninsula became a Venetian colony governed by a Provveditore Generale as the Kingdom of the Morea. The village of Vlachokerasia was situated within the district of Tripolizza in the northeastern province of Romania. The Venetians attempted to revitalize the Morean economy and produced a large amount of records which are preserved in the State Archives of Venice. A census conducted by the Venetian administration in 1700 counted 200 people in 48 families residing in the village of 'Vlaco Chierasia'. Local tithe-collection policies alienated the local population and caused a large number of indebted villagers to flee. The unpopularity of the Venetians among the local population meant that when the Ottomans recaptured Morea in 1715, the local population did not resist.

=== Administrative history ===
- In 1835, with 289 inhabitants (123 families), Vlachokerasia was designated the seat of the municipality of Manthyrea in the province of Mantineia.
- In 1841, the 18 municipalities of the province of Mantineia were reduced to 9 and the municipality of Manthyreas was abolished. The settlement of Vlachokerasia was merged into the municipality of Kaltezon.
- In 1869, the settlement was split from the municipality of Kaltezon, and was designated as the seat of the reconstituted municipality of Manthyrea.
- In 1912, it was decided that settlements with more than 300 inhabitants and an elementary school should become independent communities. Therefore, Vlachokerasia detached from the abolished municipality of Manthyreas and became an independent community.
- In 1997, with the implementation of the Kapodistrias program (law 2539/97), Vlachokerasia was designated as the seat of the newly established municipality of Skyritida.
- In 2010, with the implementation of the Kallikratis program (law 3852/2010), the municipality of Skyritida was abolished and the settlement was annexed to the municipality of Tripoli.

== Population history ==
| Year | 1700 | 1829 | 1835 | 1844 | 1851 | 1856 | 1869 | 1879 | 1889 | 1896 | 1907 | 1920 | 1928 | 1940 | 1951 | 1961 | 1971 | 1981 | 1991 | 2001 | 2011 | 2021 |
|---|---|---|---|---|---|---|---|---|---|---|---|---|---|---|---|---|---|---|---|---|---|---|
| Population | 200 | 497 | 289 | 881 | 965 | 1097 | 1100 | 1383 | 1440 | 1509 | 1633 | 1482 | 1576 | 1576 | 1211 | 783 | 709 | 676 | 487 | 481 | 414 | 385 |
| Sources | | | | | | | | | | | | | | | | | | | | | | |
