= Cypsela =

Cypsela may refer to:

== Places ==
- Cypsela (Arcadia), a fortress of ancient Arcadia, Greece
- Cypsela (Thrace), a fortress of ancient Thrace, now in Turkey

- İpsala, the modern town on the site of Cypsela in Thrace

- Cypsela (Catalonia), an ancient, possibly mythical city named in Avienus' Ora Maritima which would have been located in the coast of modern Catalonia and is transcribed as Cypsela, Cípsela or Gypsela in Catalan

== Other uses ==
- Cypsela (botany)
