= Lepida Gorge =

Canyon in Greece

Coordinates: 37°20′33″N 22°37′37″E

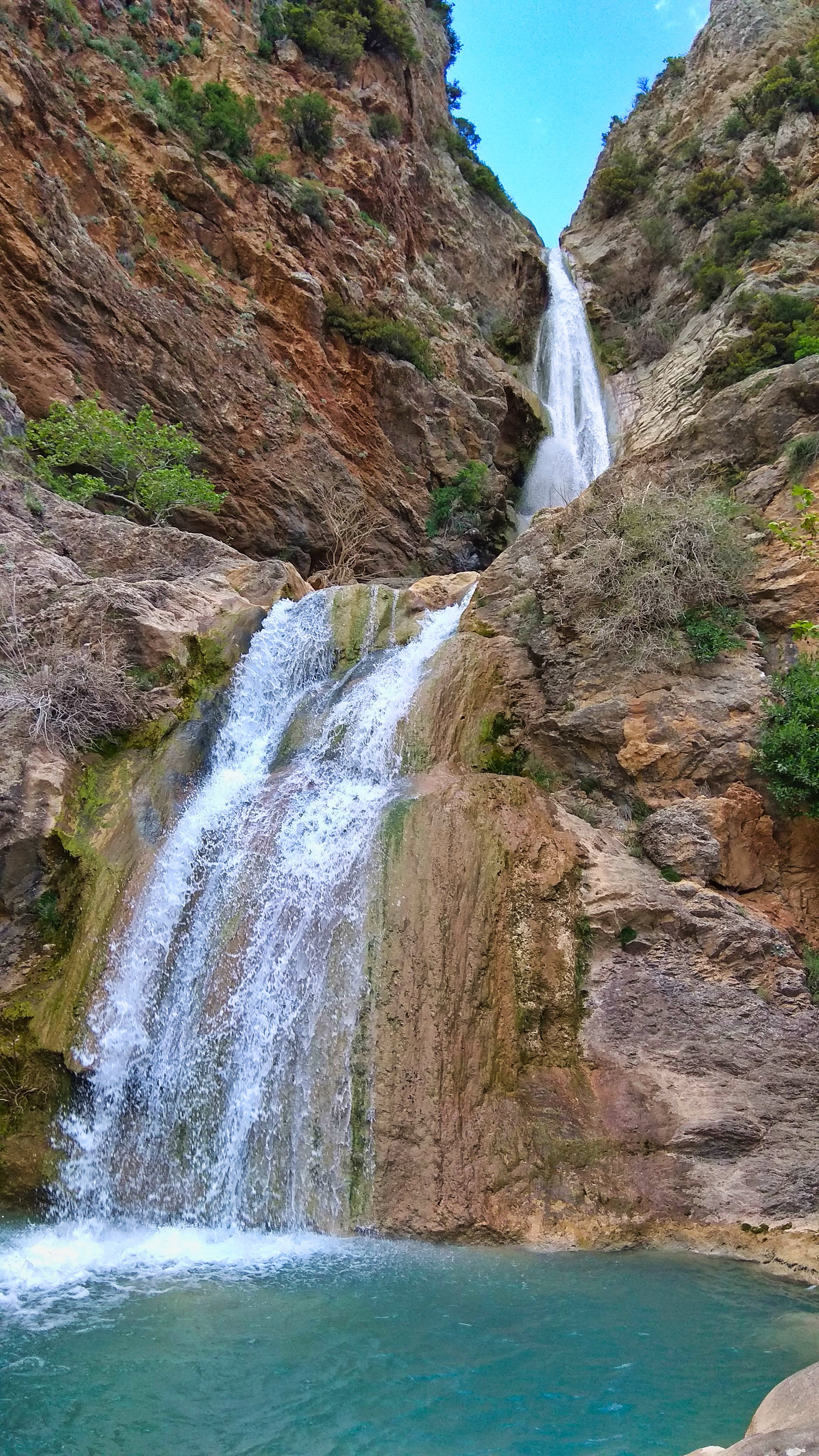
- Lepida waterfalls

- Location within Greece
- Floor elevation: 625 m (2,051 ft)

Geography
- Country: Greece
- State/Province: Peloponnese
- District: North Kynouria
- Population center: Astros
- Interactive map of Lepida Gorge

The Lepida Gorge (Greek: Φαράγγι Λεπίδας) is a natural formation of Mount Parnon, located in the region of Arcadia, Peloponnese. Despite having a length of only 500 metres, a relatively big waterfall of 70 meters height and a smaller one of 45 meters run through its course.

The waterfalls' springs start from the Xirokabi plateau, located between the village of Agios Ioannis and Malevi monastery. As the river flows down from the plateau to the gorge, it forms little lakes throughout its course.

The first waterfall is located at a distance of 3 kilometers from the village of Agios Ioannis. Access to its base is via a dirt road and after a short hike on a path of about 200 meters. The second waterfall (called "Melissi") is located at a distance of 1.5 km from the village of Platanos, on the road to Astros and at a distance of 19 km from the latter. It can be reached after 800 meters of walking along the river bed from the nearest highway, going against the flow of the river.

The gorge is ideal for canyoning and rappelling excursions. An ideal time to visit the place is spring, as the flow of water stops during the summer months.

The old Oria castle is located nearby.

== See also ==
- List of waterfalls
