= Ium =

Ium may refer to:

- Ium (Greece), a town of ancient Laconia, Greece
- -ium, a systematic naming of chemical elements
- Ium, an animal in the "Betelgeuse cycle" of the comic series Worlds of Aldebaran

== See also ==
- IUM (disambiguation)
