= Elatos, Arcadia =

Elatos Έλατος
- Community
- Location within Greece
- Coordinates: 37°21′N 22°33′E
- Country: Greece
- Administrative region: Peloponnese
- Regional unit: Arcadia
- Municipality: North Kynouria

Population (2021)
  - Community: 26
- Time zone: UTC+2 (EET)
  - Summer (DST): UTC+3 (EEST)

Elatos (Greek: Έλατος, before 1927: Δραγαλεβός – Dragalevos) is a village in the municipality of North Kynouria, Arcadia, Greece. It is situated on a forested mountainside in the northern Parnon mountains, at 840 m elevation. It is 0.5 km south of Oria, 3 km north of Agios Petros, 16 km southwest of Astros and 24 km southeast of Tripoli.

== Population ==
Year	Population
1981	178
1991	214
2001	80
2011	56
2021	26

== See also ==
- List of settlements in Arcadia
