= Paralio Astros =

Paralio Astros Παράλιο Άστρος
- Community
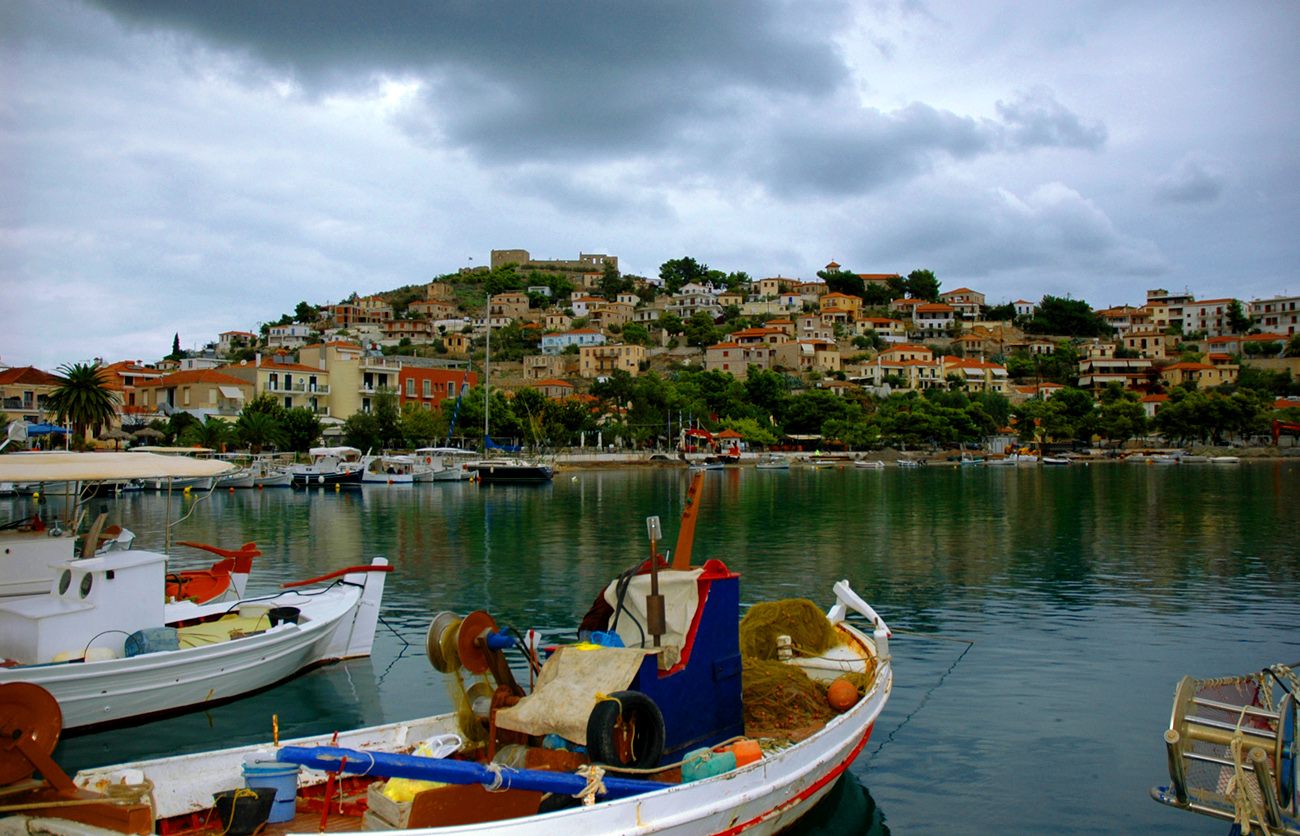
- The old part of the settlement

- Location within Greece
- Coordinates: 37°24′57″N 22°45′58″E
- Country: Greece
- Administrative region: Peloponnese
- Regional unit: Arcadia
- Municipality: North Kynouria
- Elevation: 10 m (33 ft)

Population (2021)
  - Community: 1,059
- Time zone: UTC+2 (EET)
  - Summer (DST): UTC+3 (EEST)
- Postal code: 220 01
- Area code: 27550

Paralio Astros (Greek: Παράλιο Άστρος) is a port serving the inland town of Astros, Arcadia, Greece. It is part of the municipality of North Kynouria and is considered a traditional settlement. It is built on the northern part of the coast of Arcadia in the eastern Peloponnese. As of 2021, the village had 1,059 permanent inhabitants.

Paralio Astros possesses beaches and a harbour (renovated in 2015) which can accommodate small ships. A medieval Frankish fortress commands the heights of a peninsula called "The Island" which juts out to form the harbour. The main square is at the foot of the castle mount.

Nowadays its principal industry is tourism. It is a popular vacation spot for inhabitants of Tripoli and other parts of Greece.

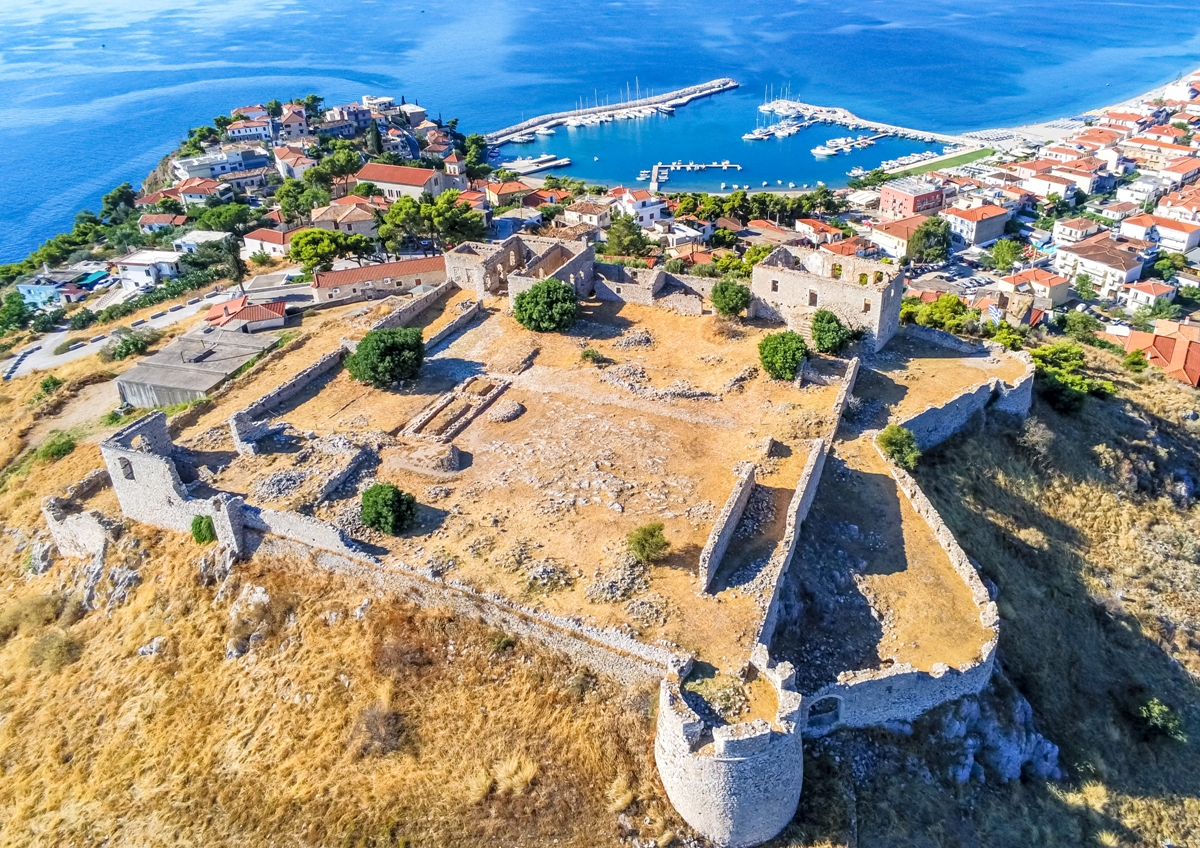
The castle of Paralio Astros

== See also ==
- Lepida Gorge
- List of settlements in Arcadia
- List of traditional settlements of Greece
