= Propontis Tsakonian =

Extinct dialect of Tsakonian

- Vatka-Havoutsi
- Προποντίδας Τσακωνική
- Native to: Greece and Turkey
- Region: Throughout Greece, Vatika and Havoutsi
- Ethnicity: Tsakonians
- Extinct: 1970
- Language family: Indo-European: Hellenic; Greek; (disputed); Doric; Doric proper; Laconian?; Tsakonian; Propontis Tsakonian

Language codes
- ISO 639-3: –
- Glottolog: prop1240

Propontis Tsakonian is an extinct dialect of Tsakonian, formerly spoken on the Sea of Marmara or Propontis, specifically in two villages near Gönen, called Vatika and Havoutsi. During the 1922 population exchange between Greece and Turkey, speakers of Propontis Tsakonian were resettled into Greece. Liosis states the dialect has not been properly been reasearched and had information gathered due to its historical conditions and ultimate extinction.

== History ==
The emergence of the Propontis community is either dated to the settlement of Tsakonians the 13th century by the Byzantine emperor Michael VII Doukas, which was explicitly referenced by the historian George Pachymeres, or from the time of the 1770 Orlov Revolt with the migration of Tsakonians in the 18th century. It was concentrated in two villages near Gönen, called Vatika and Havoutsi. From the late 18th century and onwards, the community developed connections with neighbouring Greek and Turkish-speaking centres that included intermarriage, which along with the strong links with the church and Standard Modern Greek led to a linguistic disadvantage for Tsakonian and monolinguism for its community. In 1914, the Tsakonians were internaly exiled with other Greeks from Propontis due to the outbreak of World War I, which the surviving population later returned in 1919. In 1922, during the population exchange between Greece and Turkey, the Propontis Tsakonians were scattered across Greece, mostly in various villages in Greek Macedonia. At the time they numbered less than 500 people in total. This resulted in Propontis Tsakonian being replaced as the primary language of its community by Standard Modern Greek and the language only being spoken by the elderly. In 1970, the dialect went extinct.

== Phonology ==
Propontis Tsakonian clitic pronouns have similar restristions as in Medieval Greek and modern Eastern Greek dialects that proceed with the verb unless the verb is in itial position, where clitics follow it. This was shown by Costakis (1957) as θωράκαΐ ν’ τον αγό (They saw the rabbit) and μα τ’ παρακαλέσ’ (I will ask you). However, Propontis Tsakonian has two clitics cluster together when clitic pronouns and auxiliaries co-occur in one verb phrase. Costakis (1957) provides the example πουλώ τα-σι ένα γρόσ’ (He wanted to sell (was selling) them for one piaster).

== Characteristics ==
Propontis Tsakonian was overall more conservative grammatically, but was also influenced by the nearby Thracian Greek dialects that are linguistically closer to Standard Modern Greek. For an example of the standardizing Thracian Greek influence, compare the Northern and Southern word for water, ύο (ýo, derived from Ancient Greek: ὕδωρ) to Propontic νερέ and Standard νερό (neré, neró).

== Glossary ==
The following list comes depict Propontis Tsakonian words in the Greek script, it's lexeme, it's phonetics/phonemics and the English translation.

English	Lexeme	Phonetic/Phonemic	Greek
ant	mermī́tsi	/me̞rˈmitsi/	μερμίτσι
bird	fútsa	/puˈli/	πουλί
blood	aī́ma	/aˈima/	αΐμα
bone	kokálē	/ˈkokale/	κοκάλη
burn	kaī́ō	/kaˈio/	καΐω
die	pethánw	/peˈθano/	πεθάνω
dig	skávgo	/ˈskavɣo/	σκάβγω
dog	skyllí	/sciˈli/	σκυλλί
drink	pínw	/ˈpino/	πίνω
fish	psári	/ˈpsari/	ψάρι
good	kalé	/kaˈle/	καλέ
say	lalw/vaī́ō	laˈo/vaˈio	(λ)α(λ)ώ/βαΐω

== Bibliography ==
- Liosis, Nikos (December 2019a). Tsakonian studies: The State-of-the-art. Thessaloniki: Institute of Modern Greek Studies.
- Liosis, Nikos (December 2019b). Systems in disruption: Propontis Tsakonian. Thessaloniki: Institute of Modern Greek Studies, Aristotle University of Thessaloniki.
