= Thanasis Costakis =

Greek linguist (1907–2009)

- Born: 1907; Pera Melana, South Kynouria, Arcadia
- Died: 2009 (aged 101–102)
- Occupations: Linguist; lexicographer
- Known for: Devising the Costakis orthography to represent phonemes (sounds) used in Tsakonian but not other Hellenic languages.

Thanasis Costakis (Greek: Θανάσης Κωστάκης, 1907–2009) was a Greek linguist and lexicographer best known for his work on the critically endangered Tsakonian language spoken in the eastern Peloponnese.

Costakis was born in Pera Melana in Arcadia, a Tsakonian-speaking village. Costakis taught at several gymnasia and lycea in Athens before affiliating with the Academy of Athens, where he contributed to the composition of the Historical Lexicon of Modern Greek. In addition to his linguistic works, he also published a volume on the traditional architecture of Tsakonia. Costakis also developed a writing system for the Tsakonian language, which included orthography using dots, spiritus asper, and caron for use in his works, which has been used in his grammar and local editions of dialectical texts.

== Works ==
- Historical Lexicon of Modern Greek, The Academy of Athens, Athens: 1933–present (contributor)
- A Brief Grammar of the Tsakonian Dialect, The French Institute of Athens, Athens: 1951.
- Tsakonian Popular Architecture, The Academy of Athens, Athens: 1961.
- Le parler grec d'Anakou, Centre for Asia Minor Studies, Athens: 1964.
- The Tsakonian of Propontis, The Academy of Athens, Athens: 1979.
- Lexicon of the Tsakonian Dialect, The Academy of Athens: 1986.
