= Panopoulos =

Panopoulos is a Greek surname. Notable people include:

- Mike Panopoulos (born 1976), Greek-born Australian-Greek footballer
- Sam Panopoulos (1934–2017), Greek-born Canadian businessman, inventor of Hawaiian pizza
