= Prastos =

Village in Arcadia, Greece

Prastos Πραστός
- Community
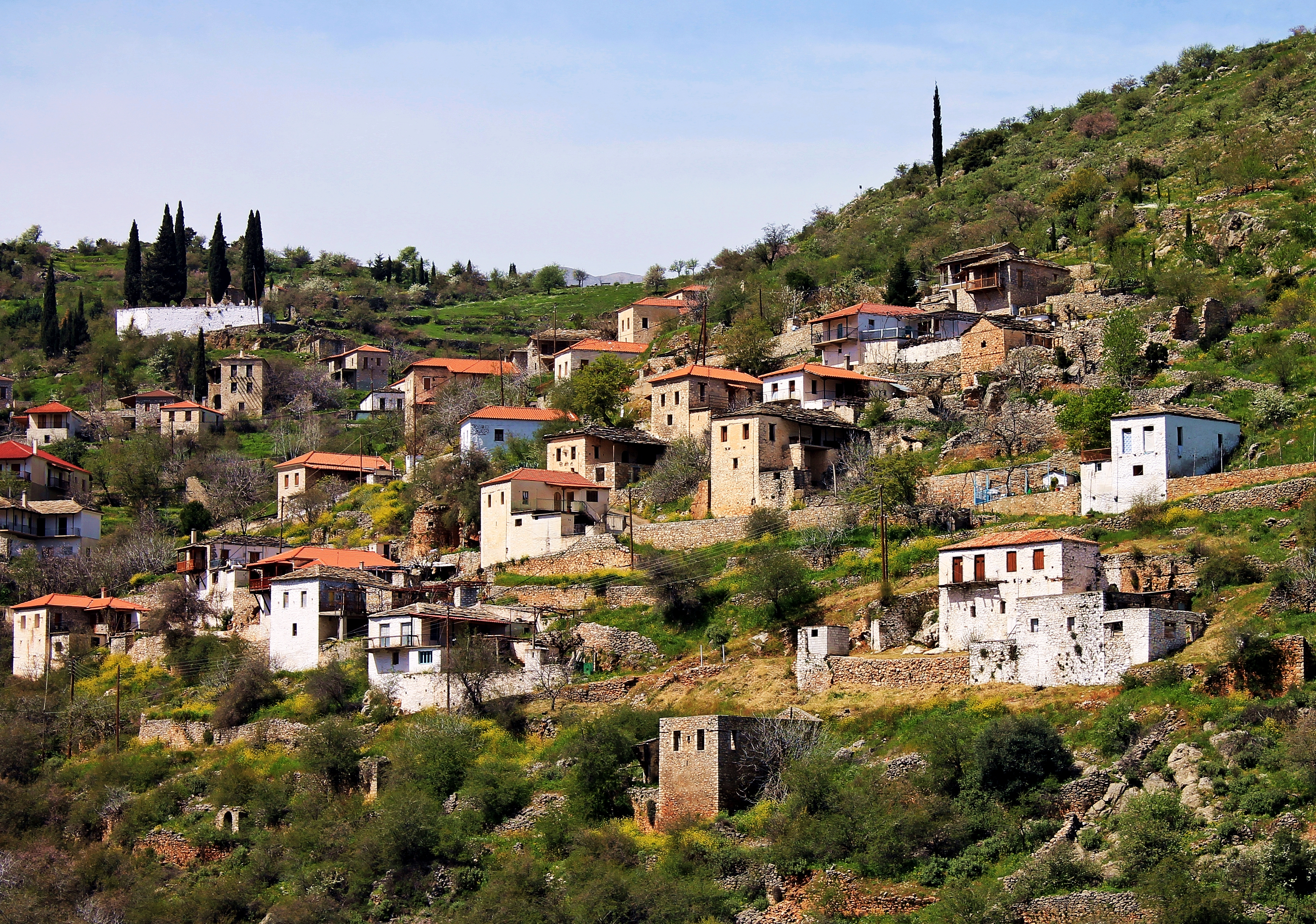
- View of Prastos

- Location within Greece
- Coordinates: 37°16′N 22°41′E
- Country: Greece
- Administrative region: Peloponnese
- Regional unit: Arcadia
- Municipality: North Kynouria
- Elevation: 255 m (837 ft)

Population (2021)
  - Community: 465
- Time zone: UTC+2 (EET)
  - Summer (DST): UTC+3 (EEST)
- Postal code: 221 00
- Area code: 27550

Prastos (Greek: Πραστός, Tsakonian: Πραστέ) is a settlement in Arcadia, Greece. Formerly, Prastos was the premier town of the Tsakonian region, but declined in importance after its devastation by Ibrahim Pasha of Egypt during the Greek War of Independence and a general economic migration to urban areas that occurred in the following decades. It is considered a traditional settlement.

== History ==
During the Ottoman period, Prastos was the leading city of Tsakonia, and one of the richest in the Peloponnese. The inhabitants had special trading rights granted by the Sublime Porte, which contributed to the town's economic success. It was the seat of a bishopric, that of "Rheoi and Prastos."

During the Greek War of Independence, the town was sacked by Ibrahim Pasha of Egypt and its olive groves burned, making the settlement unsuitable for habitation for decades hence. Much of the surviving population fled to Leonidio and the Argolid and could not be persuaded to return to the relatively less fertile mountains even after the olive groves had recovered.

== See also ==
- List of settlements in Arcadia
- List of traditional settlements of Greece
