= Iasus (Laconia) =

Ancient town of Laconia, location uncertain

Iasus or Iasos (Ancient Greek: Ἴασος) was a town in ancient Laconia, which Pausanias describes as belonging to the Achaeans. William Smith conjectures that Iasus may be the same as Oeum; the editors of the Barrington Atlas of the Greek and Roman World conjecture that it may be the same as Caryae.

Its site is dependent on which, if either, of the conjectures is correct.
