= Kollines =

Kollines Κολλίνες
- Community
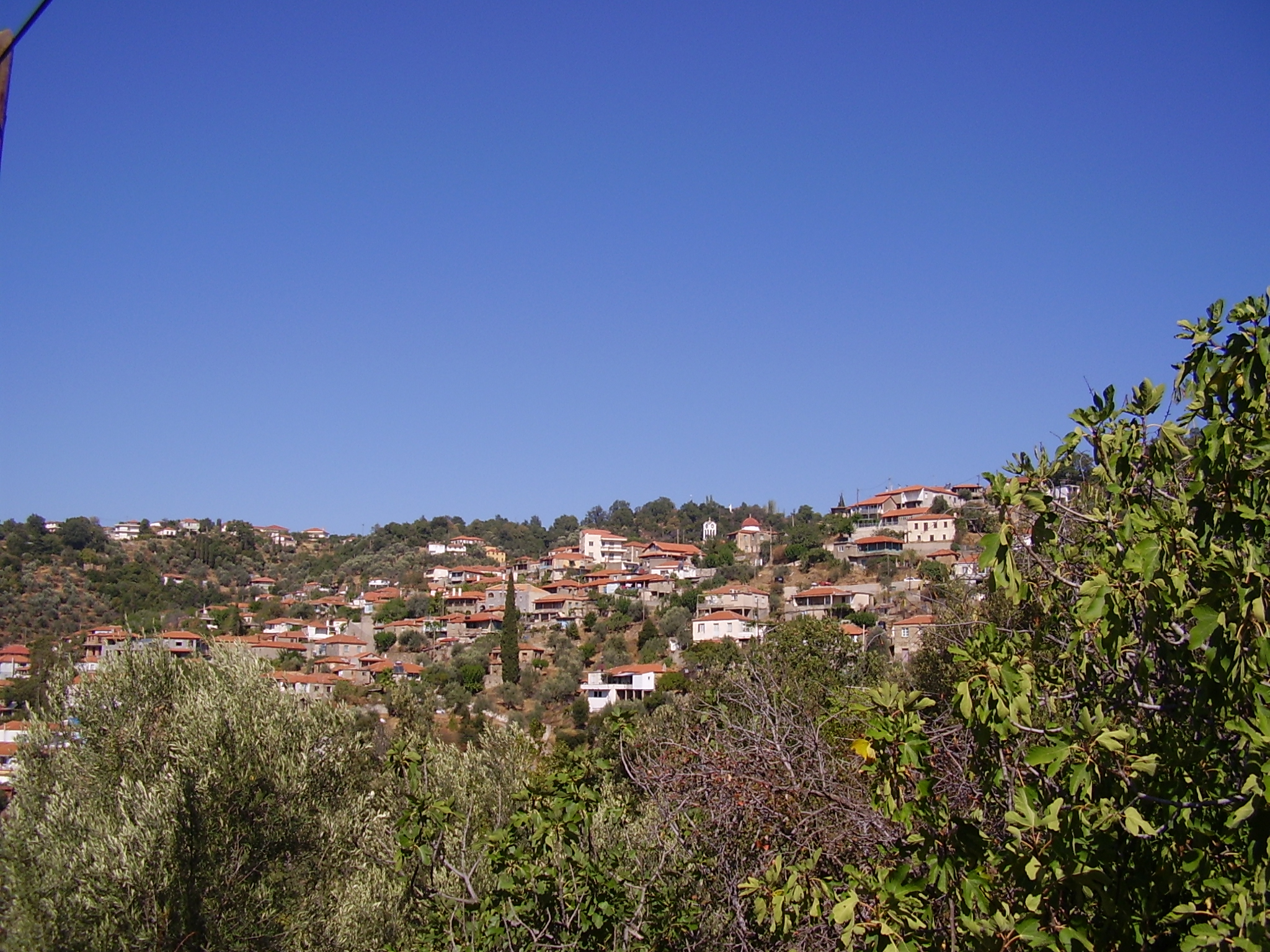

- Location within Greece
- Coordinates: 37°17.2′N 22°21.6′E
- Country: Greece
- Administrative region: Peloponnese
- Regional unit: Arcadia
- Municipality: Tripoli
- Municipal unit: Skiritida
- Elevation: 780 m (2,560 ft)

Population (2021)
  - Community: 194
- Time zone: UTC+2 (EET)
  - Summer (DST): UTC+3 (EEST)
- Postal code: 220 11

Kollines (Greek: Κολλίνες) is a village and a community in the municipal unit of Skiritida, Arcadia, Greece. It is situated in the green mountains near the border with Laconia. The community consists of the main village Kollines and the small villages Achouri and Voutouchos. It is located 1 km east of Agia Varvara, 9 km south of Vlachokerasia and 25 km south of Tripoli.

== Museum ==
The cultural association Friends of Skyritida opened a folklore museum in Kollines in 1997. Located in the primary school, the museum displays tools, clothes, photographs, and other print material to show how the older generations lived in the area.

== Historical population ==
Historical population
Year	Pop.	±%
1981	721	—
1991	622	−13.7%
2001	384	−38.3%
2011	267	−30.5%
2021	194	−27.3%

== See also ==
- List of settlements in Arcadia
