= IUM =

IUM may refer to:

- Independent University of Moscow
- International University of Management in Windhoek, Namibia
- International University of Monaco
- Internet Usage Manager, a product by Hewlett-Packard in its OpenView framework

== See also ==
- Ium (disambiguation)
