= Kastanitsa =

Village in Arcadia, Greece

Kastanitsa Καστάνιτσα
- Community

- Location within Greece
- Coordinates: 37°15′53″N 22°38′59″E
- Country: Greece
- Administrative region: Peloponnese
- Regional unit: Arcadia
- Municipality: North Kynouria
- Elevation: 840 m (2,760 ft)

Population (2021)
  - Community: 204
- Time zone: UTC+2 (EET)
  - Summer (DST): UTC+3 (EEST)
- Postal code: 221 00
- Area code: 27550

Kastanitsa (Greek: Καστάνιτσα, Tsakonian: Γαστένιτσα) is a village in Arcadia in Greece, on the southern slope of Mount Parnon. It is considered a traditional settlement. It is noted for its production of chestnuts, from which it takes its name, and for formerly being a majority Tsakonian-speaking settlement.

== History ==
Kastanitsa is first mentioned in writing in 1293, but the settlement is thought to be nearly two centuries older, founded by Tsakones fleeing the rule of Slavic tribes that had invaded the Peloponnese. According to Kastaniot tradition, the village was founded by two families called Pentalonas and Bezenikos.

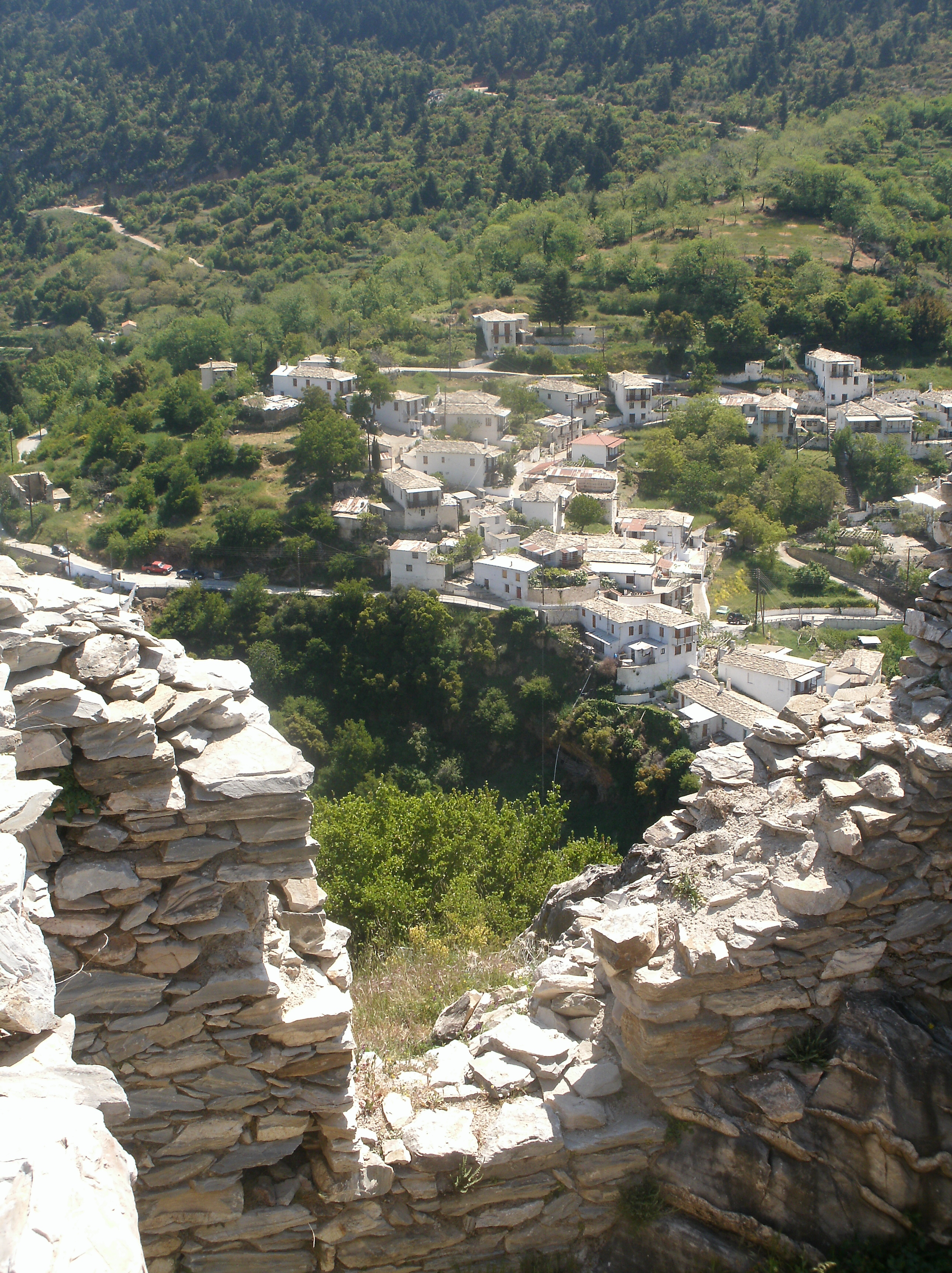
A view of Kastanitsa from the ruins of Koutoupou.

A Byzantine fort called Koutoupou was placed on the nearby hill of Pyrgos while the restored Byzantine monarchy warred with the Frankish lords of the Peloponnese to recover territory lost in the wake of the Fourth Crusade.

Further documentary evidence is scant until the eighteenth century. In 1788, a French traveller named Villehouson wrote that Kastanitsa "...has four hundred houses." In 1808, an Englishman, Martin Leek, reported that "This was once a city of great note." On 21 July 1821 the inhabitants proclaimed their independence from Turkish rule from atop the old Byzantine tower and joined in the Greek struggle for independence.

== Present-day Kastanitsa ==
Currently, the village contains around two hundred-fifty inhabitable houses, representing a significant shrinkage from Villehouson's figure of four hundred. This is not unusual in the area where many towns and villages were ruined by the depredations of Ibrahim Pasha of Egypt and never fully recovered; those that were spared eventually lost population due to economic migration in the nineteenth and twentieth centuries.

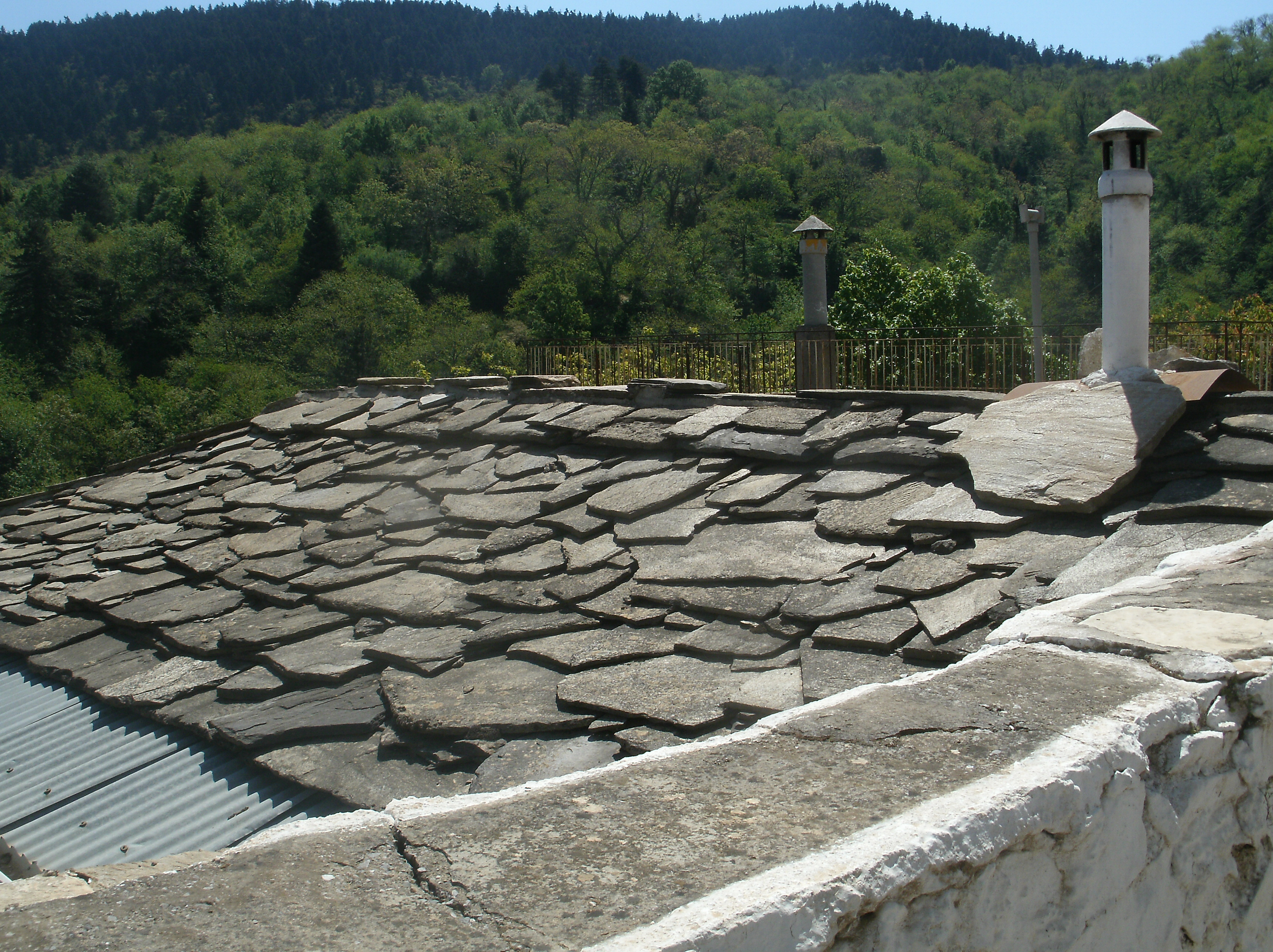
A typical Kastaniot roof.

Most houses are built from local stone, and the village is classified as a heritage site by the Greek government, which places controls on external renovations. Most roofs in Kastanitsa are made of slate, which, because of its low water absorption, is more resistant to frost damage during the winter snows.

Chestnut forests still surround the village: The largest contains 4,500 acres (18 km^{2}). In the past, these produced up to four hundred tonnes of chestnuts annually. (Historically, chestnuts were used to make dye for leather and other materials). In addition, there are thirty lime kilns for the production of plaster. (Men in Tsakonian villages often made their living in winter as itinerant plasterers in other parts of the Peloponnese and as far north as Attica, departing their villages at the feast of Saint Demetrius and returning for Holy Week). Wintertime population loss has accelerated in the automobile age, and the village presently has only around fifty year-round inhabitants, with a large influx of residents and visitors in summertime.

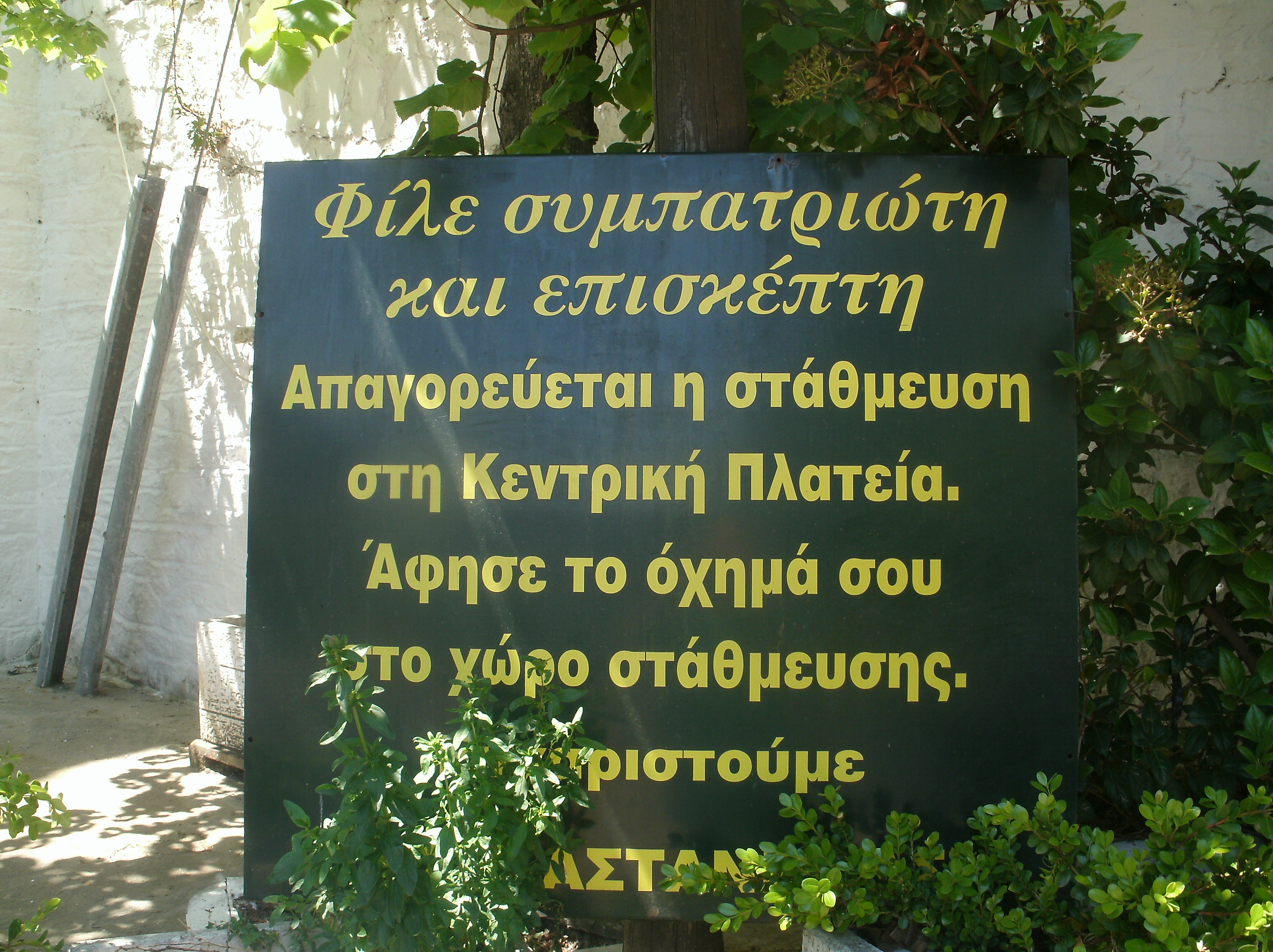
"Dear Compatriot and Visitor: Parking is forbidden in the central plaza. Leave your vehicle in the parking area. We thank you, KASTANITSA.

The village centre contains shops, cafes, taverns, a library, and the Church of the Transfiguration dating to 1780 and containing Russian woodwork donated by Catherine the Great. There are fifteen country chapels in the countryside outside the village and a church of Saint Pantaleon built on the ruins of the former monastery dedicated to Saint Nicholas, founded in 1628 and destroyed in 1826 by Ibrahim Pasha. Automobiles, with few exceptions, may not be driven in the village, and visitors are asked to park in designated areas on its outskirts.

Important holidays in the village include the Feast of the Transfiguration (August 6) and the annual Chestnut Festival, held in October.

== See also ==
- List of settlements in Arcadia
- List of traditional settlements of Greece
