= Cypsela (Arcadia) =

Fortress in ancient Arcadia

Cypsela or Kypsela (Ancient Greek: Κύψελα) was a fortress in the district of Parrhasia in ancient Arcadia, which was occupied and fortified by the Mantineians in the Peloponnesian War, in order to annoy the Lacedaemonian district Sciritis. Its site is unlocated.
