= Vourvoura =

Vourvoura Βούρβουρα
- Community
- Location within Greece
- Coordinates: 37°20.1′N 22°29.5′E
- Country: Greece
- Administrative region: Peloponnese
- Regional unit: Arcadia
- Municipality: Tripoli
- Municipal unit: Skiritida

Population (2021)
  - Community: 161
- Time zone: UTC+2 (EET)
  - Summer (DST): UTC+3 (EEST)

Vourvoura (Greek: Βούρβουρα) is a village in the municipal unit of Skiritida, Tripoli, Arcadia, Greece. It is situated in the northwestern part of the Parnon mountains, at 1,000 m above sea level. It is 5 km west of Agios Petros, 5 km north of Karyes (Laconia) and 22 km southeast of Tripoli.

== History ==
In 1822 three families escaped from Chios and fled to Vourvoura due to the Chios massacre.

In 1863 the Αθλητικός Σύλλογος Βουρβούρων was founded in Vourvoura.

In 1917 the first car was brought to Vourvoura.

In 1940 106 male Greeks from Vouvoura volunteered to fight in the Greco-Italian War

From the years 1946-1949 Vourvoura was embroiled in a civil war between royalists and communists, in which members of the communist andartes were hiding in Vourvoura and fighting in the nearby mountains.

In 2011 Vouvoura was merged into the Skiritida municipality.

== Population ==
Year	Population
1981	448
1991	462
2001	369
2011	252
2021	161

== Notable people ==
- Sam Panopoulos (1934 — 2017), inventor of the Hawaiian pizza, in Chatham, ON.
- Charalambos Zouras (1885 — 1972), an Olympian during the 1896 Summer Olympics.
