= Scirus (Arcadia) =

Scirus or Skiros (Ancient Greek: Σκίρος) was a town of ancient Arcadia, and later of Laconia in the region of Sciritis, near Mount Maenalus and Parrhasia. Its location is unknown.
