= Kerasea =

Kerasea or Kerasia may refer to several villages in Greece:

- Kerasea, Aetolia-Acarnania, a village in the municipal unit Panaitoliko, Aetolia-Acarnania
- Kerasia, Arcadia, formerly named Arvanitokerasia, a village in the municipal unit Skiritida, Arcadia
- Kerasia, Euboea, a village in the municipal unit Nileas, Euboea
- Kerasea, Ioannina, a village in the municipal unit Selloi, Ioannina regional unit
- Kerasea, Karditsa, a village in the municipal unit Plastiras, Karditsa regional unit
- Kerasea, Kozani, a village in the municipal unit Aiani, Kozani regional unit
- Kerasia, Magnesia, a village in the municipal unit Karla, Magnesia
- Kerasia, Mount Athos, a settlement in Mount Athos
- Kerasea, Rhodope, a village in the municipal unit Sostis, Rhodope regional unit
- Megali Kerasea, a village in the municipal unit Kalampaka, Trikala regional unit
- Nea Kerasia, a village in the municipal unit Michaniona, Thessaloniki regional unit
