= Sam Panopoulos =

Canadian cook and businessman (1934–2017)

- Σωτήριος Πανόπουλος
- Born: Sotirios Panopoulos; 20 August 1934; Vourvoura, Greece
- Died: 8 June 2017 (aged 82); London, Ontario, Canada
- Occupations: Chef and businessman
- Known for: Creator of Hawaiian pizza
- Spouse: Christina Panopoulos (m. 1967)
- Children: 2

Sotirios "Sam" Panopoulos (Greek: Σωτήριος Πανόπουλος; 20 August 1934 – 8 June 2017) was a Greek-born Canadian cook and businessman, credited as the inventor of Hawaiian pizza.

== Early life ==
Sotirios Panopoulos was born in Vourvoura, Greece, on 20 August 1934. He emigrated to Canada in 1954, aged 20, arriving in Halifax, Nova Scotia.

== Career ==
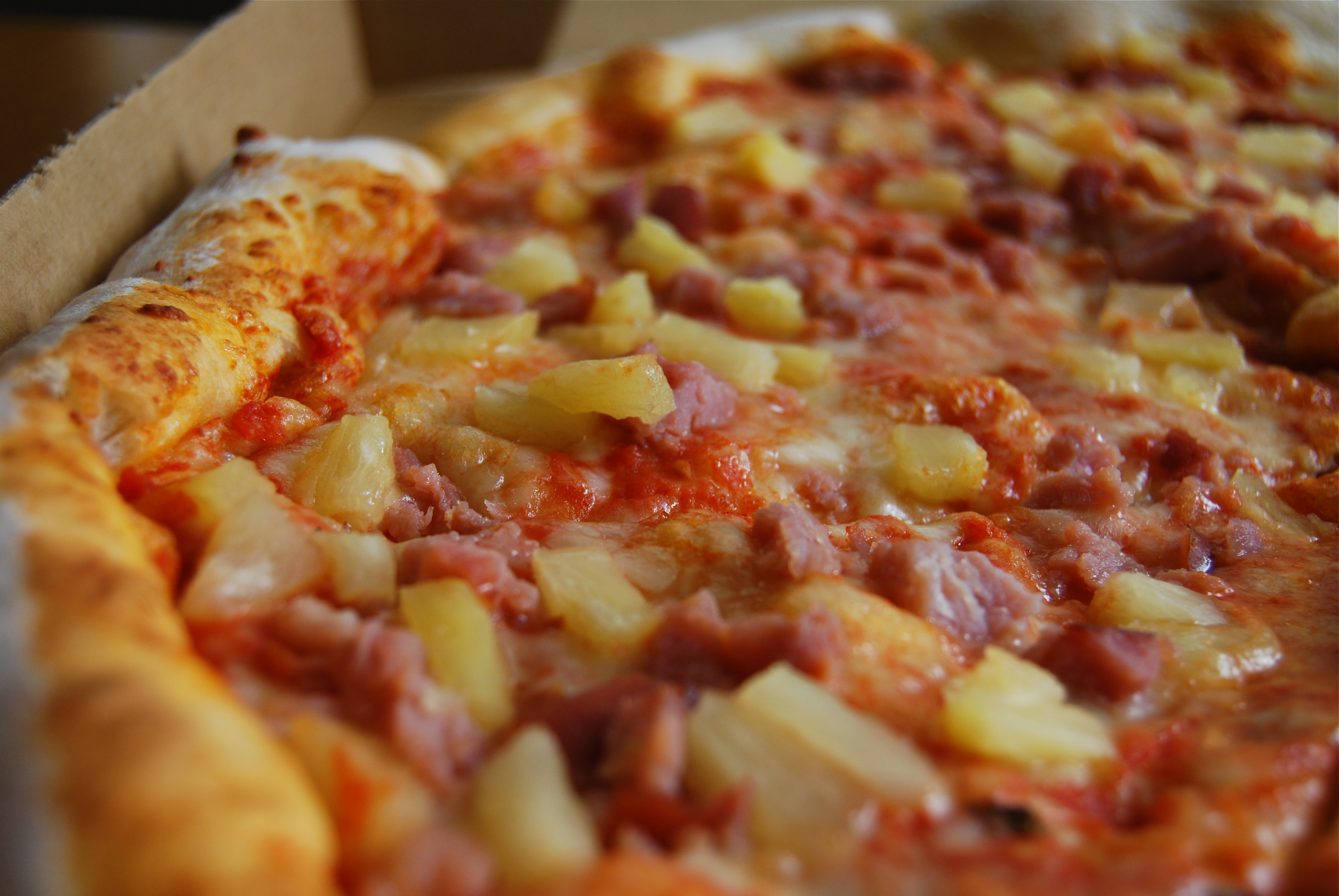
Hawaiian pizza, Panopoulos's invention

Panopoulos settled in Sudbury, and then Elliot Lake, Ontario, where he found work in the mines.

After sampling pizza in Naples, Panopoulos first tried pizza in North America when he visited Windsor, Ontario.

With his brothers Elias and Nikitas, Panopoulos owned the Satellite Restaurant in Chatham, Ontario. They offered typical American items such as burgers and fries and American Chinese dishes, some of which mix sweet and savoury flavours. In the early 1960s Panopoulos started offering pizzas, recently popular in the US. In 1962, he had the idea to add canned pineapple to pizza. This innovation (sometimes disputed) became popular with his customers, yet over time has also earned the disdain of pizza puritans.

In February 2017, when Iceland's President Guðni Th. Jóhannesson said that pineapple should be banned from pizza, Canadian Prime Minister Justin Trudeau tweeted: "I have a pineapple. I have a pizza. And I stand behind this delicious Southwestern Ontario creation."

== Personal life ==
Panopoulos and his wife Christina were married for 50 years. They had a son, a daughter, and several grandchildren.

Panopoulos sold the Satellite Restaurant in 1980, and lived in London, Ontario, for the rest of his life; he worked as a restaurateur there as well.

He died unexpectedly at University Hospital in London, Ontario, on 8 June 2017.

In October, 2025 Panopoulos was inducted into the Chatham-Kent Cultural Hall of Fame in the 'Cultural Builders' category in recognition of his invention of Hawaiian pizza.

== See also ==
- Greek Canadians
- List of Canadian inventions and discoveries
