= Skiritida =

Skiritida Σκιρίτιδα
- Municipal unit
- Location within the regional unit

- Location within Greece
- Coordinates: 37°20′N 22°24′E
- Country: Greece
- Administrative region: Peloponnese
- Regional unit: Arcadia
- Municipality: Tripoli

Area
  - Municipal unit: 186.2 km^{2} (71.9 sq mi)

Population (2021)
  - Municipal unit: 930
  - Municipal unit density: 5.0/km^{2} (13/sq mi)
- Time zone: UTC+2 (EET)
  - Summer (DST): UTC+3 (EEST)
- Vehicle registration: TP

Skiritida (Greek: Σκιρίτιδα, before 2001: Σκυρίτιδα - Skyritida) is a former municipality in Arcadia, Peloponnese, Greece. It was formed at the 1997 Kapodistrias reform; the seat of the municipality was in Vlachokerasia. Since the 2011 local government reform it is part of the municipality Tripoli, of which it is a municipal unit. The municipal unit has an area of 186.164 km^{2}. It had a population of 930 at the 2021 census.

== Subdivisions ==
The municipal unit Skiritida is subdivided into the following communities (constituent villages in brackets):

- Agia Varvara
- Alepochori
- Kerasia
- Kollines (Kollines, Achouri, Voutouchos)
- Pigadakia
- Vlachokerasia
- Vourvoura
