= North Kynouria =

Municipality in Arcadia, Greece

North Kynouria Βόρεια Κυνουρία
- Municipality
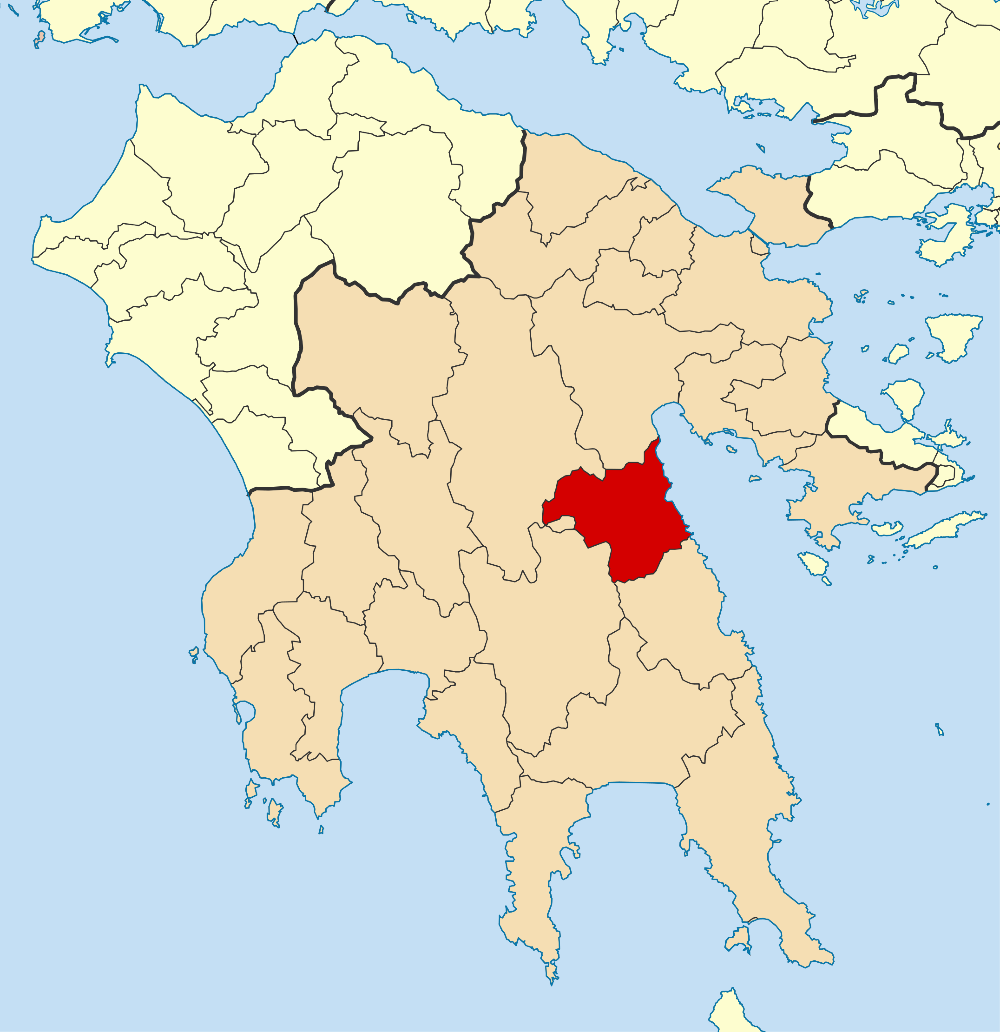

- Location within Greece
- Coordinates: 37°24′N 22°43′E
- Country: Greece
- Administrative region: Peloponnese
- Regional unit: Arcadia
- Seat: Astros
- Districts: 26

Area
  - Municipality: 576.981 km^{2} (222.774 sq mi)
- Elevation: 55 m (180 ft)

Population (2021)
  - Municipality: 9,483
  - Density: 16.44/km^{2} (42.57/sq mi)
- Time zone: UTC+2 (EET)
  - Summer (DST): UTC+3 (EEST)
- Postal code: 22001

North Kynouria (Greek: Βόρεια Κυνουρία, romanized: Vóreia Kynouría) is a municipality in Arcadia, Greece. It is located in the eastern part of the regional unit, between the northwestern shores of the Argolic Gulf and northern Laconia. Its land area is 576.981 km². Its population is 9,483 (2021 census). The seat of the municipality is in Astros. Its largest other towns or villages are Ágios Andréas (pop. 1,065), Paralio Astros (1,043), Doliana (846), Ágios Pétros (717), Meligoú (684), Korakovoúni (659), Prastós (336) and Kastrí (335).

== Subdivisions ==
The municipality is divided into 26 communities:

- Agia Sofia
- Agios Andreas (Agios Andreas, Arkadiko Chorio, Paralia Agiou Andreou)
- Agios Georgios (Aetochori, Vathia, Melissi)
- Agios Petros (Agios Petros, Moni Malevis, Xirokampi)
- Astros (Astros, Agios Ioannis, Agios Stefanos, Varvogli, Iera Moni Loukous, Chantakia)
- Charadros (Charadros, Agioi Asomatoi)
- Doliana (Ano Doliana, Dragouni, Kato Doliana, Kouvlis, Prosilia, Rouneika)
- Elatos
- Karatoulas
- Kastanitsa
- Kastri
- Korakovouni (Korakovouni, Neochori, Oreino Korakovouni)
- Koutroufa
- Meligou (Oreini Meligou, Agia Anastasia, Portes, Cheimerini Meligou)
- Mesorrachi
- Nea Chora
- Oria
- Paralio Astros
- Perdikovrysi
- Platana
- Platanos
- Prastos (Prastos, Agios Panteleimon, Moni Eortakoustis)
- Sitaina
- Stolos (Stolos, Fountoma)
- Vervena (Vervena, Kato Vervena)
- Xiropigado (Xiropigado, Metamorfosi, Plaka)

== See also ==
- Cynuria
- South Kynouria
