= Tsakonian Greek =

Modern Hellenic variety

Tsakonian
- τσακώνικα
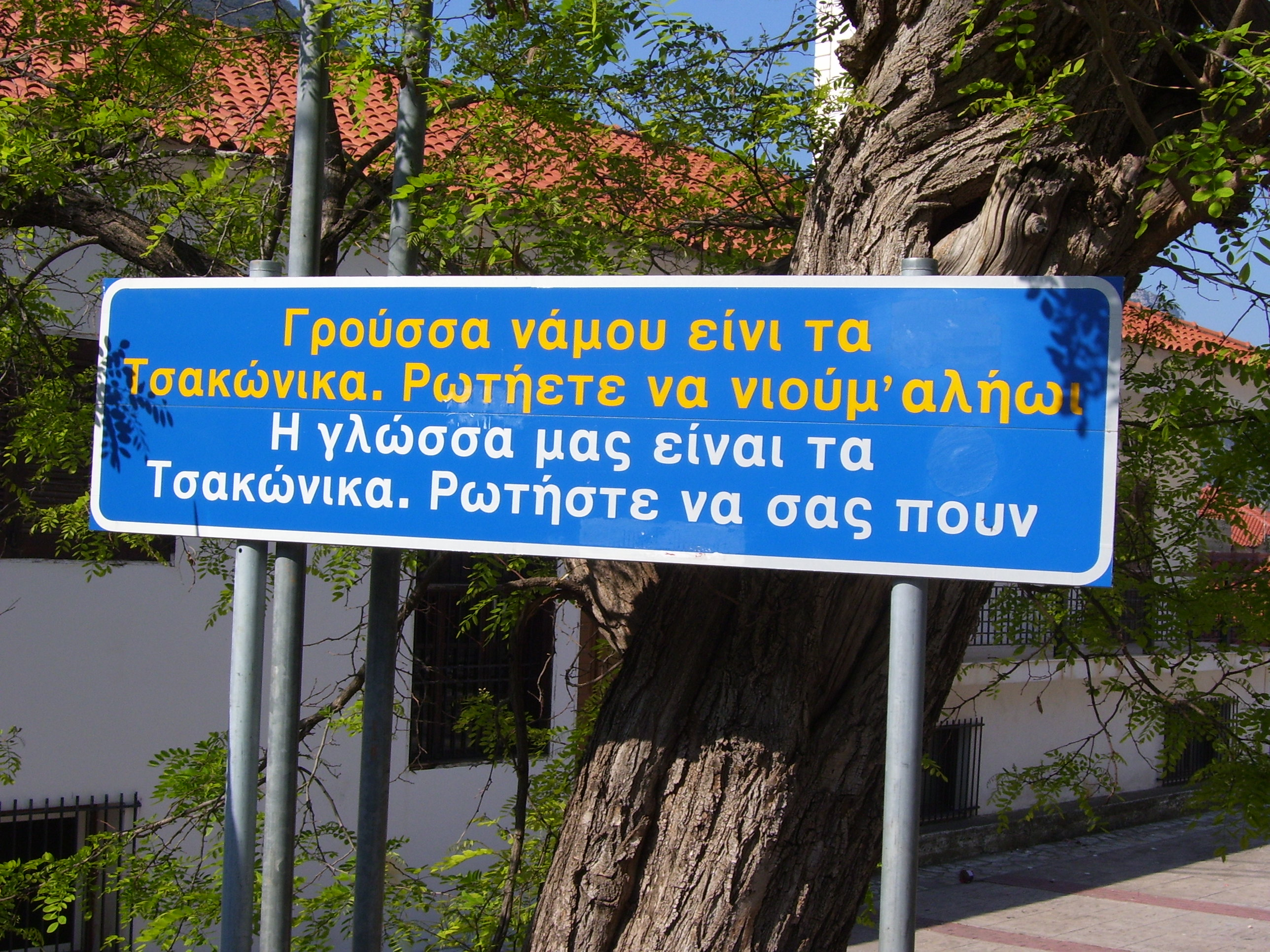
- Tsakonian: Groússa námou eíni ta Tsakónika. Rotíete na nioúm' alíoï. Standard Greek: I glóssa mas eínai ta Tsakónika. Rotíste na sas poun. 'Our language is Tsakonian. Ask and they'll tell you.' Bilingual (Tsakonian and Standard Greek) sign in the town of Leonidio.
- Native to: Greece
- Region: Eastern Peloponnese, around Mount Parnon
- Ethnicity: Tsakonians
- Native speakers: 2,000–4,000 (2018)
- Language family: Indo-European: Hellenic; Greek; (disputed); Doric; Doric proper; Laconian?; Tsakonian
- Dialects: Peloponnesian • Northern • Southern • Western? †; Propontis †

Language codes
- ISO 639-3: tsd
- Glottolog: tsak1248
- ELP: Tsakonian
- Linguasphere: 56-AAA-b
- Tsakonian is classified as Critically Endangered by the UNESCO Atlas of the World's Languages in Danger.

Tsakonian or Tsaconian (also Tzakonian or Tsakonic; Tsakonian: τσακώνικα; Standard Modern Greek: τσακώνικα or τσακωνικά) is a highly divergent modern variety of Greek, spoken in the Tsakonian region of the Peloponnese, Greece. Unlike all other extant varieties of Greek, Tsakonian derives from Doric Greek rather than from the Attic–Ionic branch. Although it is conventionally treated as a dialect of Greek, some compendia treat it as a separate language. Tsakonian is critically endangered, with only a few hundred or a few thousand, mostly elderly, fluent speakers left. Although Tsakonian and standard Modern Greek are related, they are not mutually intelligible.

== Etymology ==
The term Tsakonas or Tzakonas first emerges in the writings of Byzantine chroniclers who derive the ethnonym from a corruption of Lakonas, a Laconian/Lacedaemonian (Spartan)—a reference to the Doric roots of the Tsakonian language.

== Geographic distribution ==
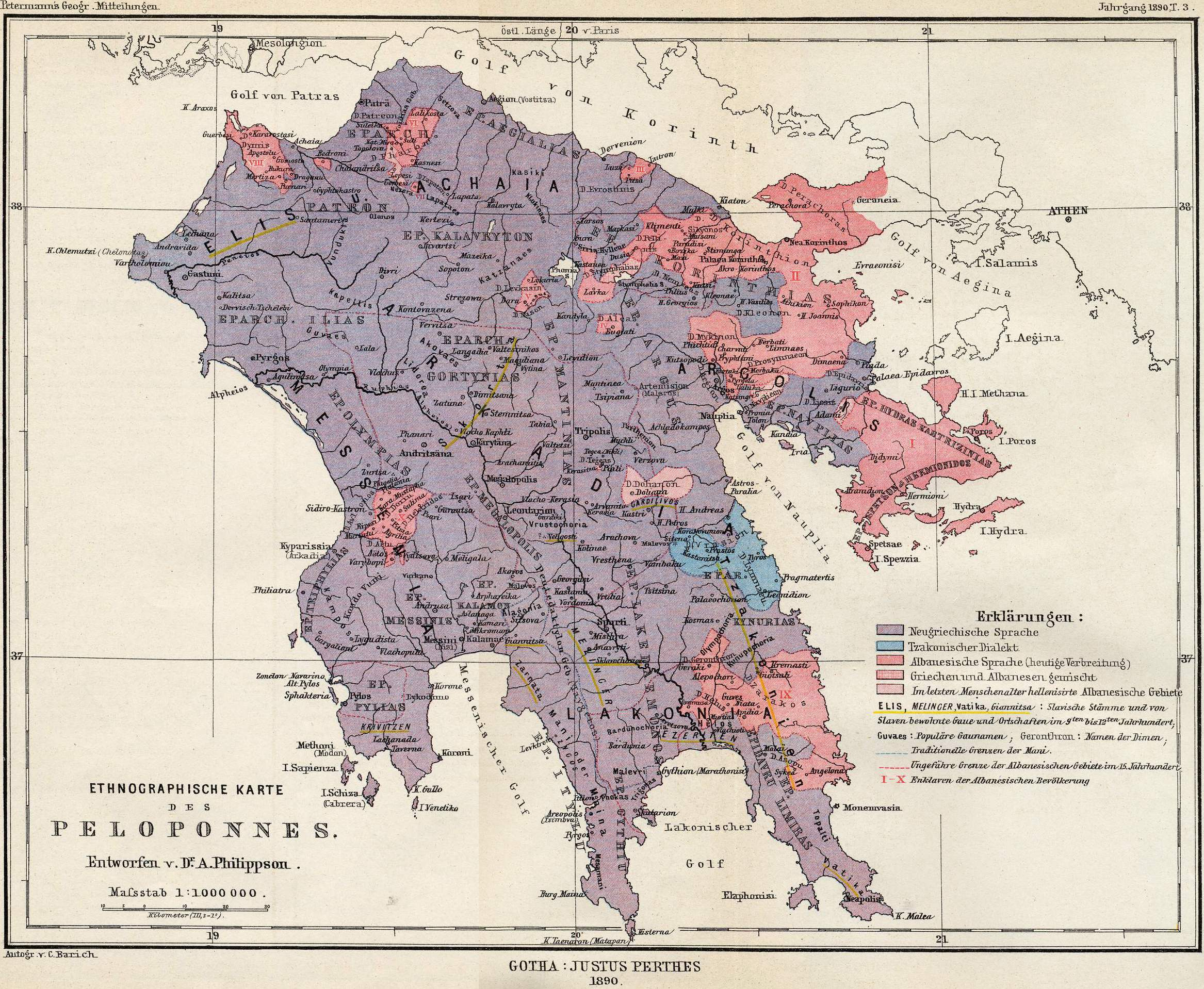
Old ethnic map of Peloponnese; Tsakonian-speaking areas in blue

Tsakonian is found today in a group of mountain towns and villages slightly inland from the Argolic Gulf, although it was once spoken farther to the south and west as well as on the coasts of Laconia (ancient Sparta).

Geographical barriers to travel and communication kept the Tsakonians relatively isolated from the rest of Greece until the 19th century, although there was some trade between the coastal towns. The rise of mass education and improved travel beginning after the Greek War of Independence meant that fluent Tsakonian speakers were no longer as isolated from the rest of Greece. In addition, during the war, the Turkish army drove the Tsakonians east, and as a result, their de facto capital shifted from Prastos to Leonidio, further making the people significantly less isolated. There began a rapid decline in speaker numbers—from an estimated 200,000 fluent speakers to between 200 and 1,000 by 2007.

Since the introduction of electricity to all villages in Tsakonia by the late 1950s, Greek mass media can reach the most remote of areas and has profoundly affected the speech of younger speakers. Efforts to revive the language by teaching it in local schools do not seem to have had much success. Standard Modern Greek is the official language of government, commerce and education, and it is possible that the continued modernization of Tsakonia will lead to the language's disappearance sometime in the 21st century.

The area where the language is found today in some villages Tsakonia slopes of Parnon in the southern province of Kynouria, including the towns of Leonidio and Tyros and the villages of Melana, Agios Andreas, Vaskina, Prastos, Sitaina and Kastanitsa.

=== Official status ===
Tsakonian has no official status. Prayers and liturgies of the Greek Orthodox Church have been translated into Tsakonian, but the ancient Koine of the traditional church services is usually used as in other locations in Greece. Some teaching materials in Tsakonian for use in local schools have reportedly also been produced.

== Dialects ==
There are three dialects of Tsakonian: Northern, Southern, and Propontis.

The Propontis dialect was spoken in what was formerly a Tsakonian colony on the Sea of Marmara (or Propontis; two villages near Gönen, Vatika and Havoutsi), whose members were resettled in Greece during the 1924 population exchange between Greece and Turkey. Propontis Tsakonian appears to have died out around 1970, although it had already stopped being the primary language of its community after 1914 when they were internally exiled with other Greeks in the region due to the outbreak of World War I. Propontis Tsakonian was overall grammatically more conservative, but it was also influenced by the nearby Thracian dialects of Greek which were much closer to Standard Modern Greek. The emergence of the Propontis community is either dated to the 13th century settlement of Tsakonians by Emperor Michael VII, explicitly referenced by Byzantine George Pachymeres or around the time of the 1770 Orlov Revolt. For an example of the standardizing Thracian Greek influence, compare the Northern and Southern word for water, ύο (ýo, derived from Ancient Greek: ὕδωρ) to Propontic νερέ and Standard νερό (neré, neró).

Of the two mainland dialects of Tsakonian, Southern Tsakonian is spoken in the villages of Melana, Prastos, Vaskina, Tiros, Leonidio, Pragmateftis and Sapounakeika, while Northern Tsakonian is found in Sitena and Kastanitsa. As early as 1971, it became difficult for researchers in the northern villages to find any informants who could offer more than "a few isolated words". The Northern villages were much more exposed to the rest of Greek society, and as a result, according to linguist Nick Nicholas, Northern Tsakonian experienced much heavier Standard Greek lexical and phonological influence, before it began to die out much faster than Southern Tsakonian. It is generally believed that Northern Tsakonian has been influenced by modern Greek and there are indeed some examples where Northern Tsakonian uses "more modern" vocabulary than its Southern counterpart. The principal difference between Northern and Southern Tsakonian is the loss of the intervocalic consonant /-l-/ which exists in Northern Tsakonian but is absent from Southern Tsakonian. According to Maxim L. Kisilier, professor of Modern Greek in the Saint Petersburg State University, the /-l-/ in Northern Tsakonian is unlikely to be an innovation influenced by Standard Modern Greek, and, as such, according to him, it's more likely that Southern Tsakonian changed instead.

There may have once been a fourth, Western, dialect of Tsakonian given the forms attested by Evliya Çelebi in the 17th century.

== Contact ==
There has always been contact with Koine Greek speakers and the language was affected by the neighboring Greek dialects. Additionally, there are some lexical borrowings from Arvanitika and Turkish. The core, base vocabulary remains recognizably Doric, although experts disagree on the extent to which other true Doricisms can be found. There are only a few hundred, mainly elderly true native speakers living, although a great many more can speak the language less than fluently.

== Phonology ==
=== Consonants ===
		Labial	Dental/Alveolar		Post- alveolar	(Alveolo-) Palatal	Velar
		Labial	plain	sibilant	Post- alveolar	(Alveolo-) Palatal	Velar
Plosive/ Affricate	tenuis	p	t	t͡s	(t͡ʃ)	(t͡ɕ)	k
Plosive/ Affricate	aspirated	pʰ	tʰ	t͡sʰ	t͡ʃʰ		kʰ
Fricative	voiceless	f	θ	s	ʃ		x
Fricative	voiced	v	ð	z	ʒ		ɣ
Nasal		m	n			ɲ	
Approximant	median					(j)	(w)
Approximant	lateral		l			ʎ	
Trill			r				

- The voiced-prenasalization of stop consonant sounds of /p, t, t͡s, k/ as [ᵐb, ⁿd, ⁿd͡z, ᵑɡ] may also occur within segments. When before front vowels /i, e/, the phonetic sequence [ᵑɡ] is then palatalized as [ᶮɟ].
- /k, kʰ, x, ɣ/ are heard as palatal sounds [c, cʰ, ç, j] when preceding front vowels /i, e/. /n, l/ may also be heard as [ɲ, ʎ] in this same position.
- [t͡ɕ] may also occur as phonemic among dialects.
- /t͡ʃʰ/ may also be heard as [t͡ʃ] among speakers.

=== Vowels ===
	Front	Central	Back
Close	i		u
Mid	e		o
Open		a	

- /i, u/ are heard as non syllabic [i̯, u̯] when following consonants and preceding other vowels.
- /o/ and /e/ in weak positions can both be heard as [ə].

=== Phonological history ===
==== Vowels ====
- A /a/ can appear as a reflex of Doric /aː/, in contexts where Attic had η [ɛː] and Modern Greek has /i/: αμέρα 'day' /aˈmera/ corresponding to Modern ημέρα /iˈmera/ 'day', κρέφτα 'thief' [ˈkrefta] corresponding to Modern κλέφτης [ˈkleftis].
- Ε /e/ > /i/ before vowels: e.g. βασιλλία /vasiˈlia/ 'king' < βασιλέα /vasiˈlea/. This sound change is absent from Propontis Tsakonian. As a result of this sound change in combination with the prior palatalization of /mi ni/ and /li/ into [ɲi] and [ʎi], the palatal allophones [ɲ] [ʎ] became phonemic. Minimal pairs example: εννία 'nine' /eˈnia/ from Ancient Greek ἐννέα vs νία /eˈɲia/ 'one (fem.)' from Ancient Greek μία.
- O occasionally [o] > [u]: ου(ι)θί /u(i)ˈθi/ < όφις /ˈopʰis/ 'snake', τθούμα [ˈtʰuma] < στόμα /ˈstoma/ 'mouth'. Final [o] > [e] after coronals and front vowels: όνος [ˈonos] > όνε [ˈone] 'donkey', πόρος /ˈporos/ > πόρε /ˈpore/ 'door', γραφτός /ɡrafˈtos/ > γραφτέ [ɣrafˈte] 'written', χρέος /ˈkʰreos/ > χρίε /ˈxrie/, but λύκος /ˈlykos/ > λιούκο /ˈʎuko/ 'wolf' and θερμόν /ˈtʰerˈmon/ > σχομό /ʃoˈmo/ 'food'.
- Υ Reflected as /i/ in most Modern Greek dialects, this was [u] in Doric and [y] in Attic. In Southern and Northern Tsakonian, that /u/ was fronted to [y], and then backed to /u/ again. The palatalization of numerous consonants before front vowels that took place right before the backing of /y/ to /u/ gives the flawed impression that /y/ was diphthongized into /ju/. Examples: λύκος /ˈlykos/ νύκτα /ˈnykta/ κρύπτων /ˈkryptoːn/ τύ /ˈty/ > /ˈʎyko/ /ˈɲytʰa/ /ˈkrʲyfu/ /eˈcy/> λιούκο /ˈʎuko/ 'wolf' νιούτθα /ˈɲutʰa/ 'night' γκρζιούφου /ˈɡʒufu/ 'hide (participle)' εκιού /eˈcu/ 'you'. As seen from the following equivalent words, <Υ> was never fronted in Propontis Tsakonian, but rather remained /u/: /ˈukʰo/ 'wolf', /ˈnutʰa/ 'night', /eˈtu/ 'you'. Any minor divergences from this model can be attributed to either internal dialectal borrowings or to borrowings from other Hellenic languages such as Maniot Greek or Standard Modern Greek.
- Ω /ɔː/ in Ancient Greek (Severe Doric /oː/), regularly goes to /u/: εζού /eˈzu/ 'I' < Ancient Greek ἐγώ /eɡɔː/, αού [au] 'say (participle)' < λαλών /laˈlɔːn/. This shift is absent from Propontis Tsakonian.

==== Consonants ====
Tsakonian in some words preserves the pre-classical Greek [w]-sound, represented in archaic Ancient Greek inscriptions by the digamma (ϝ). In Tsakonian, this sound has become a fricative [v]: βάννε [ˈvane] 'sheep', corresponding to Ancient ϝαμνός [wamˈnos] (Attic ἀμνός).

Tsakonian has extensive changes triggered by palatalisation:

- [k] > [tɕ] : κύριος [ˈkyrios] > τζιούρη [ˈtɕuri], occasionally [ts]: κεφάλι [keˈfali] > τσουφά [tsuˈfa]
- [ɡ] > [dz] : αγγίζων [aŋˈɡizɔːn] > αντζίχου [anˈdzixu]
- [p] > [c] : πηγάδι [piˈɣaði] > κηγάδι [ciˈɣaði]
- [t] > [c] : τυρός [tyˈros] > κιουρέ [cuˈre], occasionally [ts]: τίποτα [ˈtipota] > τσίπτα [ˈtsipta], πίτα [ˈpita] > πίτσα [ˈpitsa]
- [m] > [n] : Μιχάλης [miˈxalis] > Ν(ν)ιχάλη [niˈxali]
- [n] > [ɲ] : ανοίγων [aˈniɣɔːn] > ανοίντου [aˈɲindu]
- [l] > [ʎ] : ηλιάζων [iliˈazɔːn] > λιάζου [ˈʎazu]
- [r] > [ʒ] : ρυάκι [ryˈaki] > ρζάτζι [ˈʒatɕi]. This sound appears to have been a fricative trill in the 19th century, and [ʒ] survived latterly only in women's usage in Southern Tsakonian. A similar change occurred with palatalised [rʲ] in Polish and Czech.

Word-initial [r] > [ʃ]: *ράφων [ˈrafɔːn] > σχάφου [ˈʃafu]

Word-final [s] > [r], which reflects an earlier process in Laconian (rhotacism); in Tsakonian, it is a liaison phoneme: τίνος [ˈtinos] > τσούνερ [ˈtsuner]

In Southern Tsakonian, [l] is deleted before back and central vowels: λόγος [ˈloɣos] > Northern λόγο [ˈloɣo], Southern όγο [ˈoɣo]; λούζων [ˈluzɔːn] > Northern λούκχου [ˈlukʰu], Southern ούκχου [ˈukʰu];

Occasionally [θ] > [s], which appears to reflect an earlier process in Laconian, but in others [θ] is retained though the word is absent in Standard Greek: θυγάτηρ [θyˈɣatir] > σάτη [ˈsati], but Ancient θύων [ˈθyɔːn] (Modern equivalent: σφάζω [ˈsfazo]) > θύου [ˈθiu]

Tsakonian avoids clusters, and reduces them to aspirated or prenasalised stops and affricates:

- [ðr, θr, tr] > [tʃ]: δρύας, άνθρωπος, τράγος [ˈðryas, ˈanθropos, ˈtraɣos] > τσχούα, άτσχωπο, τσχάο [ˈtʃua, ˈatʃopo, ˈtʃao]
- [sp, st, sθ, sk, sx] > [pʰ, tʰ, tʰ, kʰ, kʰ]: σπείρων, ιστός, επιάσθη, ασκός, ίσχων [ˈspirɔːn, isˈtos, epiˈasθi, asˈkos, ˈisxɔːn] > πφείρου, ιτθέ, εκιάτθε, ακχό, ίκχου [ˈpʰiru, iˈtʰe, eˈcatʰe, aˈkʰo, ˈikʰu]
- [mf, nθ, ŋx] > [pʰ, tʰ, kʰ]: ομφαλός, γρονθία, ρύγχος [omfaˈlos, ɣronˈθia, ˈryŋxos] > απφαλέ, γροτθία, σχούκο [apʰaˈle, ɣroˈtʰia, ˈʃukʰo]
- [ks] > [ts]: ξερός [kseˈros] > τσερέ [tseˈre]
- [kt, xθ] > [tʰ]: δάκτυλο, δεχθώ [ˈðaktylo, ðexˈθɔː] > δάτθυλε, δετθού [ˈðatʰile, ðeˈtʰu]
- [l] after consonants often goes to [r]: πλατύ, κλέφτης, γλώσσα, αχλάδες [plaˈty, ˈkleftis, ˈɣlɔːsa, aˈxlaðes] > πρακιού, κρέφτα, γρούσα, αχράε [praˈcu, ˈkrefta, ˈɣrusa, aˈxrae]
- [rp, rt, rk, rð] > [mb, nd, ŋɡ, nd]: σκορπίος, άρτος, άρκα, πορδή [skorˈpios, ˈartos, ˈarka, porˈði] > κχομπίο, άντε, άγκα, πφούντα [kʰomˈbio, ˈande, ˈaŋɡa, ˈpʰunda]

In the common verb ending -ζω, [z] > [nd] : φωνάζων [foˈnazɔːn] > φωνιάντου [foˈɲandu]

[z, v] are added between vowels: μυία, κυανός [myˈia, kyaˈnos] > μούζα, κουβάνε [ˈmuza, kuˈvane]

[ɣ, ð] often drop out between vowels: πόδας, τράγος [ˈpoðas, ˈtraɣos] > πούα, τσχάο [ˈpua, ˈtʃao]

=== Prosody ===
Tsakonian Greek:

original song

Πουλάτζι ἔμα ἐχα τθὸ κουιβί τσαὶ μερουτέ νι ἔμα ἐχα
ταχίγα νι ἔμα ζάχαρι ποϊκίχα νι ἔμα μόσκο,
τσαί ἁπό τὸ μόσκο τὸ περσού τσαὶ ἁπὸ τὰ νυρωδία
ἑσκανταλίστε τὁ κουιβί τσ' ἑφύντζε μοι τ' αηδόνι.
Τσ' ἁφέγκι νι ἔκει τσυνηγού μὲ τὸ κουιβί τθὸ χέρε.
Ἔα πουλί τθὸν τόπο ντι ἔα τθα καϊκοιτζίαι,
να ἄτσου τὰ κουδούνια ντι νἁ βάλου ἄβα τσαινούρτζα.

Tsakonian Greek:

Latin transcription

Poulátzi éma ékha tʰo kouiví tse merouté ni éma ékha
takhíga ni éma zákhari poïkíkha ni éma mósko
tse apó to mósko to persoú tse apó ta nirodía
eskantalíste to kouiví ts' efíntze mi t' aïdóni.
Ts' aféngi ni éki tsinigoú me to kouiví tʰo khére.
Éa poulí tʰon tópo nti, éa tʰa kaïkitzíe
na átsou ta koudoúnia nti na válou áva tsenoúrtza.

Tsakonian Greek:

IPA transcription

puˈlatɕi ˈema ˈexa tʰo kwiˈvi tɕe meruˈte ɲ ˈema ˈexa
taˈçiɣa ɲ ˈema ˈzaxaʒi po.iˈkixa ɲ ˈema ˈmosko
tɕ aˈpo to ˈmosko to perˈsu tɕ aˈpo ta ɲiroˈði.a
eskandaˈʎiste to kwiˈvi tɕ eˈfidze mi t a.iˈðoɲi
tɕ aˈfeɲɟi ɲ ˈeki tɕiɲiˈɣu me to kwiˈvi tʰo ˈçere
ˈe.a puˈʎi tʰon ˈdopo di ˈe.a tʰa ka.ikiˈtɕi.e
n ˈatsu ta kuˈðuɲa di na ˈvalu ˈava tɕeˈnurdza

Standard Modern Greek

Πουλάκι είχα στο κλουβί και μερομένο το είχα.
το τάιζα ζάχαρη και το πότιζα μόσχο
και από τον πολύ τον μόσχο και την μυρωδιά του
εσκανταλίστη και το κλουβί και μου έφυγε τ' αηδόνι
Κι' ο αφέντης το κυνηγάει με το κλουβί στο χέρι:
Έλα πουλί στον τόπο σου, έλα στην κατοικία σου
ν' αλλάξω τα κουδούνια σου να βάλω άλλα καινούργια

Standard Modern Greek:

Latin transcription

Pouláki íkha sto klouví ke meroméno to íkha
to táïza zákhari ke to pótiza móskho
ke apó ton polí ton móskho ke tin mirodiá tou
eskantalísti ke to klouví ke mou éfige t' aïdóni.
Ki' o aféntis to kinigáï me to klouví sto khéri
Éla poulí ston tópo sou, éla stin katikía sou
n' allákso ta koudoúnia sou na válo álla kenoúrgia.

Standard Modern Greek:

IPA transcription (see Modern Greek phonology)

puˈlaci ˈixa sto kluˈvi ce meroˈmeno to ˈixa
to ˈta.iza ˈzaxari ce to ˈpotiza ˈmosxo
c aˈpo tom boˈli tom ˈmosxo ce tim miroˈðja tu
eskandaˈlisti ce to kluˈvi ce mu ˈefiʝe t a.iˈðoni
c o aˈfendis to ciniˈɣa.i me to kluˈvi sto ˈçeri
ˈela puˈli ston ˈdopo su ˈela stiŋ ɡatiˈci.a su
n alˈakso ta kuˈðuɲa su na ˈvalo ˈala ceˈnurʝa

English translation

I had a bird in a cage and I kept it happy
I gave it sugar and wine-grapes
and from the great amount of grapes and their essence,
the nightingale got naughty [possibly means it got drunk] and escaped.
And its master now runs after it with the cage in his hands:
Come my bird back where you belong, come to your house
I will remove your old bells and buy you new ones.

=== Phonotactics ===
Tsakonian avoids consonant clusters, as seen, and drops final [s] and [n]; as a result, syllable structure tends more to CV than in Standard Modern Greek. (The use of digraphs in tradition spelling tends to obscure this). For instance, ancient [hadros] "hard" goes to Tsakonian [a.tʃe], where /t͡ʃ/ can be considered a single phoneme; it is written traditionally with a trigraph as ατσχέ (=atskhe).

== Writing system ==
Traditionally, Tsakonian used the standard Greek alphabet, along with digraphs to represent certain sounds that either do not occur in Demotic Greek, or that do not commonly occur in combination with the same sounds as they do in Tsakonian. For example, the [ʃ] sound, which does not occur in standard Greek, occurs in Tsakonian, and is spelled as σχ (much like German sch). Another sound recalls Czech ř. Thanasis Costakis invented an orthography using dots, spiritus asper, and caron for use in his works, which has been used in his grammar and several other works. That is more like the Czech usage of the háček (such as š). Lastly, unpalatalized n and l before a front vowel can be written double to contrast with a palatalised single letter; essentially the opposite of Spanish ñ and ll (e.g. in Southern Tsakonian ένει [eɲi] 'I am', έννι [eni] 'he is' – the former corresponds to Northern Tsakonian έμι [emi] and Standard Greek είμαι [ime]).

Transcribing Tsakonian
Digraphs	Costakis	IPA
σχ	σ̌	ʃ
τσχ	σ̓	tʃ
ρζ	ρζ	rʒ
τθ	τ̔	tʰ
κχ	κ̔	kʰ
πφ	π̔	pʰ
τζ	(Κ) τζ̌ – τζ & τρζ̌ — τρζ (Λ) τζ̌ – τζ	(K) tɕ, trʒ (L) tɕ d͡ʒ
νν	ν̇	n (not ɲ)
λλ	λ̣	l (not ʎ)

Note: (K) is for the northern dialect of Kastanitsa and Sitaina, (Λ) and (L) for the southern which is spoken around Leonidio and Tyros.

== Grammar ==
Tsakonian has undergone considerable morphological changes: there is minimal case inflection.

The present and imperfect indicative in Tsakonian are formed with participles, like English but unlike the rest of Greek: Tsakonian ενεί αού, έμα αού 'I am saying', 'I was saying' ≈ Greek ειμί λαλών, ήμην λαλών.

Tsakonian			English
Masculine	Feminine	Neuter	English
Ένει Ení			I am
Έσει Esí			you are
Έννι Éni			he/she/it is
Έμε Éme			we are
Έτθε Éthe			you are
Είνι Íni			they are
Έμα Éma			I was
Έσα Ésa			you were
Έκη Éki			he/she/it was
Έμαϊ Émaï			we were
Έτθαϊ Éthaï			you were
Ήγκιαϊ Ígiaï			they were
ένει φερήκχου feríkhou	ένει φερήκχα feríkha	ένει φερήκχουντα ferikhouda	I bring
έσει φερήκχου feríkhou	έσει φερήκχα feríkha	έσει φερήκχουντα ferikhouda	you bring
έννι φερήκχου feríkhou	έννι φερήκχα feríkha	έννι φερήκχουντα ferikhouda	he/she/it brings
έμε φερήκχουντε feríkhude		έμε φερήκχουντα feríkhuda	we bring
έτθε φερήκχουντε feríkhude		έτθε φερήκχουντα feríkhuda	you bring
είνι φερήκχουντε feríkhude		έμε φερήκχουντα feríkhuda	they bring

Note that participles change according to the gender of the subject of the sentence.

Tsakonian has preserved the original inflection of the aorist indicative.

Tsakonian	English
ενέγκα enéga	I brought
ενέντζερε enédzere	you brought
ενέντζε enédze	he/she/it brought
ενέγκαμε enégame	we brought
ενέγκατε enégate	you brought
ενέγκαϊ enégaï	they brought

This aorist is the only monolectic tense in Tsakonian. However, Propontis Tsakonian frequently used a periphrasis with the active past participle in place of the aorist. For example, Propontis aɣapikó ma meant 'I loved'.

=== Morphology ===
Another difference between Tsakonian and the common Demotic Greek dialect is its verb system – Tsakonian preserves different archaic forms, such as participial periphrasis for the present tense. Certain complementisers and other adverbial features present in the standard Modern Greek dialect are absent from Tsakonian, with the exception of the Modern που (/pu/) relativiser, which takes the form πφη (/pʰi/) in Tsakonian (note: traditional Tsakonian orthography uses the digraph ⟨πφ⟩ to represent aspirated /pʰ/). Noun morphology is broadly similar to Standard Modern Greek, although Tsakonian tends to drop the nominative, final -ς (-s) from masculine nouns, thus Tsakonian ο τσχίφτα o tshífta for Standard o τρίφτης o tríftis 'grater'.

== Sample texts ==
English	Modern Greek	Tsakonian (Greek alphabet)	Tsakonian (Latin script)	Tsakonian (Costakis Notation)
Where is his/her/its room?	Πού είναι το δωμάτιό του/της;	Κιά έννι το όντα σι;	Kiá éni to óda si?	κιά έν̇ι το όντα σι;
Where is the beach?	Πού είναι η παραλία;	Κιά έννι το περιγιάλλι;	Kiá éni to perigiáli?	κιά έν̇ι το περιγιάλ̣ι;
Where is the bar?	Πού είναι το μπαρ;	Κιά έννι το μπαρ;	Kiá éni to bar?	κιά έν̇ι το μπαρ;
Don't touch me there!	Μη μ' αγγίζεις εκεί!	Μη' μ' αντζίζερε όρπα!	Mi m' andzízere órpa!	Μη με ατζίζερε όρπα!

== See also ==
- Tsakonia
