= Historical Lexicon of Modern Greek =

The Historical Lexicon of Modern Greek, as Commonly Accepted as the Living Language, and of Its Dialects Greek: Ἱστορικὸν Λεξικὸν τῆς Νέας Ἑλληνικῆς, τῆς τε κοινῶς ὁμιλουμένης καὶ τῶν ἰδιωμάτων (ΙΛΝΕ) is a specialist lexicon for the study of the modern Greek language, compiled under the auspices of the Academy of Athens. An ongoing project begun in the nineteenth century, the first volume was published in 1933, and the sixth, and most recent, in 2016. Ongoing research for the lexicon is conducted by the Centre for Research in Modern Greek Dialects and Idioms at the Academy of Athens.
