= Malevi Monastery =

- Μονή Μαλεβής
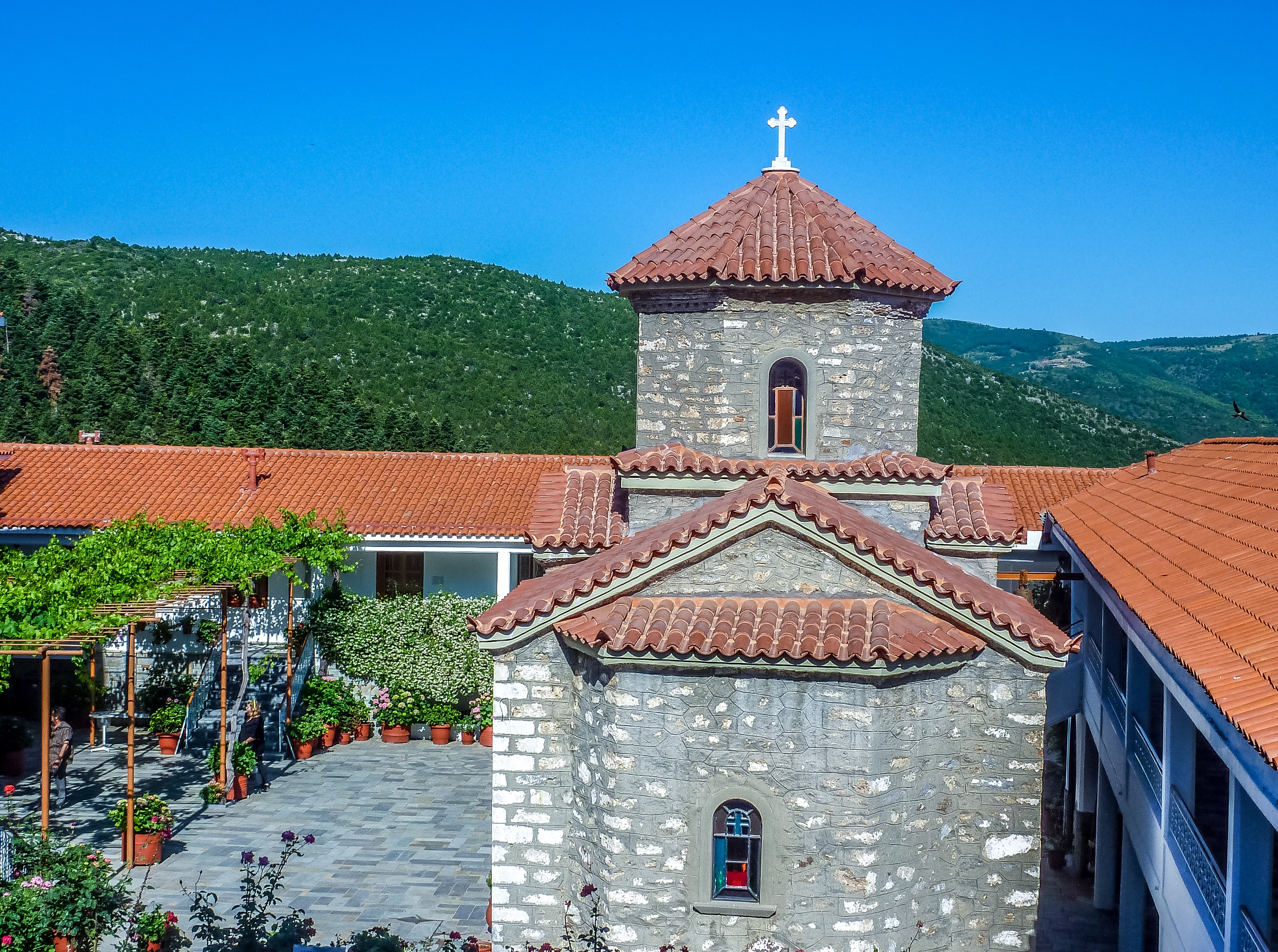

Monastery information
- Other names: Monastery Dormition of Theotokos Malevi
- Established: 8th century
- Dedicated to: Dormition of Theotokos
- Celebration date: August 23
- Diocese: Metropolis of Mantineia and Kynouria

Site
- Location: Arcadia
- Country: Greece
- Coordinates: 37°19′42″N 22°34′56″E

The Holy Monastery of Malevi (Greek: Ιερά Μονή Μαλεβής) is a historical monastery dedicated to the Dormition of the Virgin and belongs to the Metropolis of Mantineia and Kynouria. It is located on the slopes of Mount Parnonas, at an altitude of 900 meters, and is 20 km away from Astros, and 5 km from the village of Agios Petros.

== Background ==
The name "Malevi" is derived from the local name for the peak of Mount Parnon, "Malevos". According to tradition, the first monastery here was founded in 717 AD, but it was located in a different place to today's monastery, and, more specifically, it was situated in a protected spot (with the purpose of avoiding raids from criminals) in the "Canals" area.

Legend dictates that, one winter, due to bad weather, all of the monks starved to death. The story goes that, in the 10th century, a shepherd discovered the image of the Virgin in the bushes, and thus the religious community's interest in the monastery was rekindled.

The first movement took place in 1320, according to a golden decree of the emperor Andronikos II Palaiologos. A few years later, the miraculous, fragrant icon of the Virgin Mary, probably the work of Luke the Evangelist, was silvered. By the beginning of the 17th century, the monastery was functioning; this occurred after the Turkish authorities, in 1609, granted permission to rebuild what was a dilapidated church in Platanos.

The second movement of the monastery took place in 1616, according to the founding inscription, by Abbot Iosif Karatzas. In the following years, Agios Nilos the Myrovlitis (born Nikolaos Terzakis, †1651) became a monk at the monastery; he later became an ascetic on Mount Athos.

On May 8, 1786 the Turks, to take revenge for their defeat by the Zacharias thieves and the Agiopetrites thieves, with Thanasis Karamelas and Antonakis Alevizos being the most important, set fire to the monastery. During the years of the Revolution of 1821, the abbot of the monastery, Kallinikos Tsiamouris, became a member of the Filiki Eteria, and, as a doctor, helped many fighters, and Dimitrios Ypsilantis.

In 1826 Ibrahim Pasha destroyed the monastery. Years later, during the German occupation, the Germans bombed the monastery, because a hospital that helped the rebels of Parnon was housed there.

== Architecture ==
The catholicon of the monastery belongs to the inscribed cruciform type with a dome and interior; it is newly painted. In the upper part of the courtyard area, a Byzantine-style church dedicated to the Virgin Mary has recently been built.

Around the catholicon new cells and auxiliary spaces have been built, and the chapels of Agios Nilos, Agios Nektarios and Agios Georgios are located. The Malevi Monastery has a stake in Agios Charalambos in the village of Korakovouni. The monastery was converted into a nunnery in 1949, and currently has 14 nuns. Her Catholic Church celebrates the Presentation of the Virgin on August 23.

== Sources ==
- Petros Sarantakis, Arcadia: Its monasteries and churches, a journey of 10 centuries, Oiatis Publications, Athens 2000. ISBN 960-91420-0-1.
