= Oeum =

Coordinates: 37°21′56″N 22°23′43″E

Oeum or Oion (Ancient Greek: Οἰόν or Οἶον), also known as Ium or Ion (Ἰόν), was the chief town of the district Sciritis in ancient Laconia. It commanded the pass through which was the road from Tegea to Sparta.

When the Theban army under Epaminondas first invaded Laconia in four divisions, by four different passes, the only division which encountered any resistance was the one which marched through the pass defended by Oeum. But the Spartan Ischolaus, who commanded a body of troops at this place, was overpowered by superior numbers; and the invading force thereupon proceeded to Sellasia, where they were joined by the other divisions of the army. In Xenophon the town is called Ἰόν and the inhabitants Ἰᾶται; but the form Οἰόν or Οἶον is probably more correct. Such towns or villages, situated upon mountainous heights, are frequently called Oeum or Oea. Probably the Oeum in Sciritis is referred to in Stephanus of Byzantium under Οἶος. Oeum is not mentioned subsequently, unless we suppose it to be the same place as Iasus (Ἴασος), which Pausanias describes as situated within the frontiers of Laconia, but belonging to the Achaeans.

Its site is tentatively near modern Kerasia.
