= Astros, Greece =

Town in Arcadia, Greece

Astros Άστρος
- Community
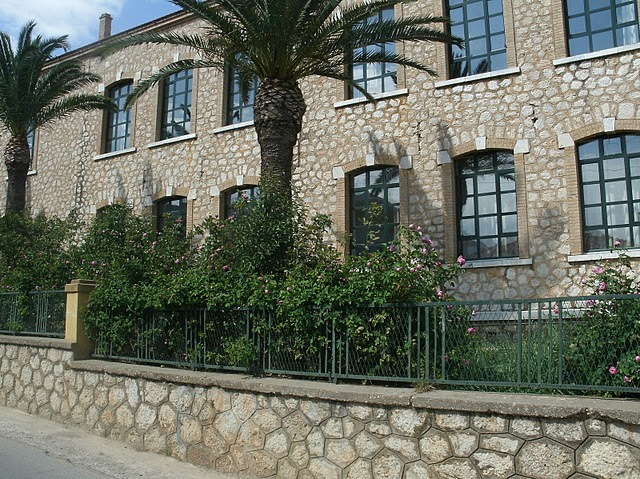
- Public school in Astros

- Location within Greece
- Country: Greece
- Administrative region: Peloponnese
- Regional unit: Arcadia
- Municipality: North Kynouria
- Elevation: 40 m (130 ft)

Population (2021)
  - Community: 2,474
- Time zone: UTC+2 (EET)
  - Summer (DST): UTC+3 (EEST)
- Postal code: 220 01
- Area code: 2755

Astros (Greek: Άστρος) is a town near the Argolic Gulf in the northeast Peloponnese in eastern Arcadia. It is the seat of North Kynouria municipality (Greek: Βόρεια Κυνουρία) and is accessible by the road connecting Corinth and Argos to the south. Its port, Paralio Astros lies 4 km to the northeast of the inland town.

== History ==
The name of the town, built during the Greek War of Independence, is supposed to be taken from the ancient settlement Astron, mentioned in Ptolemy's Geography.

Astros was the site of the Second National Assembly of the Hellenes during the Greek War of Independence, under the presidency of Petros Mavromichalis. This assembly produced the first constitution of Modern Greece.

== The town ==
The town has an elementary school, a high school, two lyceums, a number of churches including one which is situated on a hilltop, banks and a post office. There is a health clinic on the road to Leonidio. There is a number of public squares, the most westerly of which contains a small amphitheater built into the hillside.

Sometimes the town is referred by non-locals as Mesogeio Astros (Μεσόγειο Άστρος, "Inland Astros") to distinguish it from Paralio Astros ("Coastal Astros").

== Geography ==
=== Geology ===
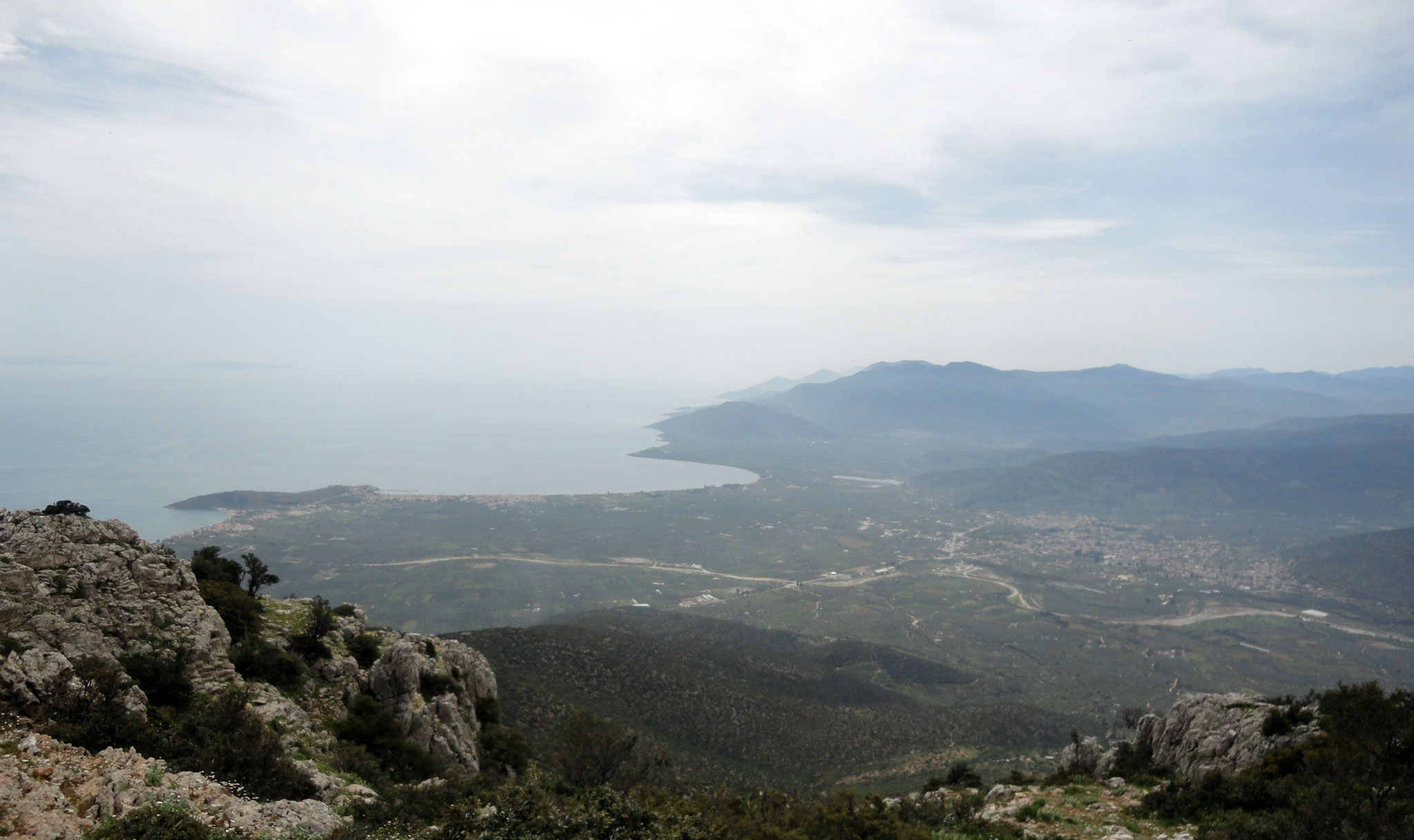
Valley of Thyrea, Astros is visible on the right

Astros is located in east-central Peloponnese. Much of its land is rocky and bushy and unsuitable for cultivation, but there are some farms and groves in low-lying areas near town.

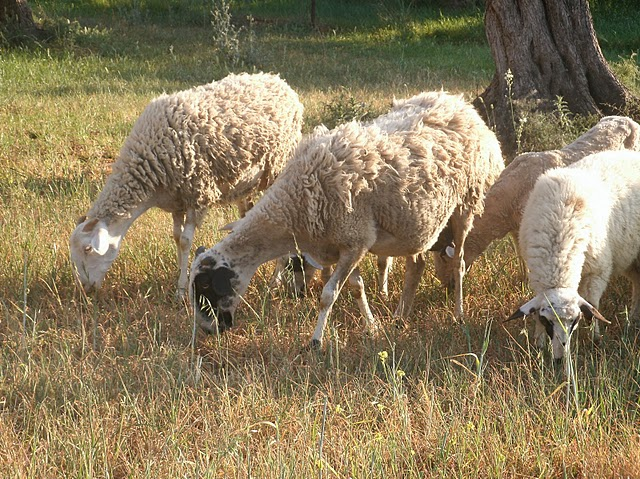
Sheep grazing on a farm just east of Astros

=== Climate ===
Astros has a hot-summer Mediterranean climate (Köppen climate classification: Csa) with hot and dry summers and mild to cool winters. Rain falls mostly in winter, with relatively little rain in the summer.

Climate data for Astros (1974-2010)
| Month | Jan | Feb | Mar | Apr | May | Jun | Jul | Aug | Sep | Oct | Nov | Dec | Year |
|---|---|---|---|---|---|---|---|---|---|---|---|---|---|
| Mean daily maximum °C (°F) | 14.0 (57.2) | 14.3 (57.7) | 16.7 (62.1) | 20.3 (68.5) | 25.7 (78.3) | 30.9 (87.6) | 33.7 (92.7) | 33.2 (91.8) | 29.1 (84.4) | 24.1 (75.4) | 19.0 (66.2) | 15.4 (59.7) | 23.0 (73.5) |
| Daily mean °C (°F) | 10.1 (50.2) | 10.4 (50.7) | 12.7 (54.9) | 16.1 (61.0) | 21.3 (70.3) | 26.3 (79.3) | 28.9 (84.0) | 28.4 (83.1) | 24.5 (76.1) | 19.8 (67.6) | 14.9 (58.8) | 11.8 (53.2) | 18.8 (65.8) |
| Mean daily minimum °C (°F) | 6.2 (43.2) | 6.3 (43.3) | 8.2 (46.8) | 10.9 (51.6) | 15.6 (60.1) | 19.9 (67.8) | 22.3 (72.1) | 22.2 (72.0) | 18.9 (66.0) | 15.0 (59.0) | 10.9 (51.6) | 8.2 (46.8) | 13.7 (56.7) |
| Average precipitation mm (inches) | 76.5 (3.01) | 73.4 (2.89) | 52.3 (2.06) | 26.0 (1.02) | 16.0 (0.63) | 6.2 (0.24) | 8.4 (0.33) | 6.4 (0.25) | 11.0 (0.43) | 54.3 (2.14) | 82.3 (3.24) | 79.9 (3.15) | 492.7 (19.39) |
| Average precipitation days | 5.5 | 5.4 | 4.5 | 2.9 | 1.6 | 0.5 | 0.5 | 0.6 | 1.0 | 3.2 | 4.6 | 5.3 | 35.6 |
| Average relative humidity (%) | 72.9 | 70.8 | 68.5 | 64.5 | 61.5 | 54.0 | 50.9 | 53.7 | 59.5 | 67.1 | 72.0 | 74.2 | 64.1 |
Source: HNMS

== Notable people ==
- Monika, singer and songwriter.

== See also ==
- Paralio Astros
- Lepida Gorge
- List of settlements in Arcadia
