= Tsakonia =

Area in the Peloponnese, Greece

Coordinates: 37°00′N 22°35′E

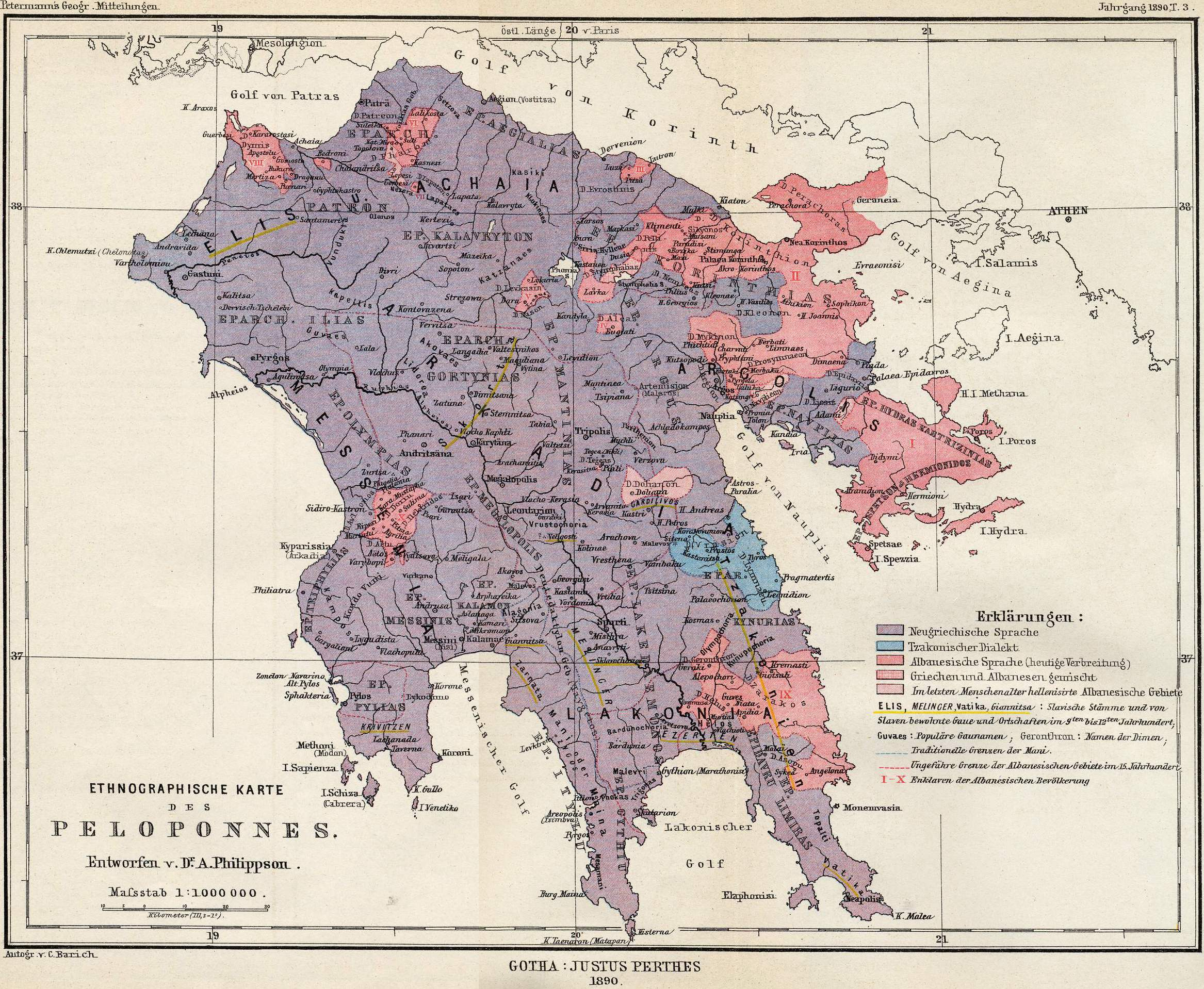
1890 ethnographic map of the Peloponnese, with Tsakonian-speaking areas in sky blue

Tsakonia (Greek: Τσακωνιά, Tsakoniá; Tsakonian: Τσακωνία, Tsakonía) or the Tsakonian region (Τσακωνικός χώρος) refers to the small area in the eastern Peloponnese where the Tsakonian language is spoken, in the area surrounding 13 towns, villages and hamlets located around Pera Melana in Arcadia. It is not a formally defined political entity of the modern Greek state.

== Extent ==
In his Brief Grammar of the Tsakonian Dialect published in 1951, Prof. Thanasis Costakis defines Tsakonia as the area from the town of Agios Andreas in Kynouria south to Leonidio and Tyros and inland as far as Kastanitsa and Sitaina, but asserts that in former times the Tsakonian-speaking area extended as far as Cape Malea in eastern Laconia. The principal town in Tsakonia at this time was Prastos, which benefited from a special trading privilege granted by the authorities in Constantinople. Prastos was burned by Ibrahim Pasha in the Greek War of Independence and was abandoned, with many of its residents fleeing to the area around Leonidio and Tyros or other spots on the Argolic Gulf.

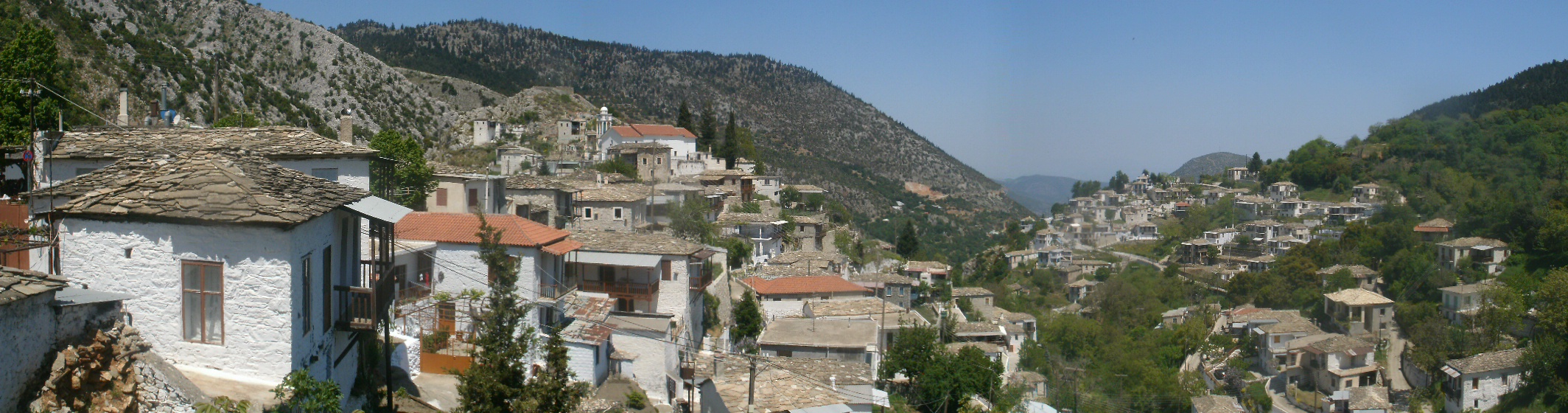
Panoramic view of Kastanitsa

Some early commentators seem to have confused the speech of Maniot dialect speakers with true Tsakonian, demonstrating the flexible nature of the term.

The actual Tsakonian speech community has shrunk greatly since Brief Grammar was published, but the area delineated by Costakis is still considered "Tsakonia" due to the preservation of certain cultural traits such as the Tsakonian dance and unique folk costumes.

The Tsakonian speaking region was once much more widespread than it was at the time of Brief Grammar; Evliya Çelebi noted in 1668 that the village of Vatika, far south of Leonidio, was Tsakonian; however that place would later be resettled by Arvanites; the Chronicle of Morea (14th century) furthermore indicates that Tsakonian was spoken in Cynuria, which is now part of Arcadia but was once considered to be in the northeast of Laconia. The original Tsakonian region may have consisted of the entire eastern half of Laconia.

== History ==
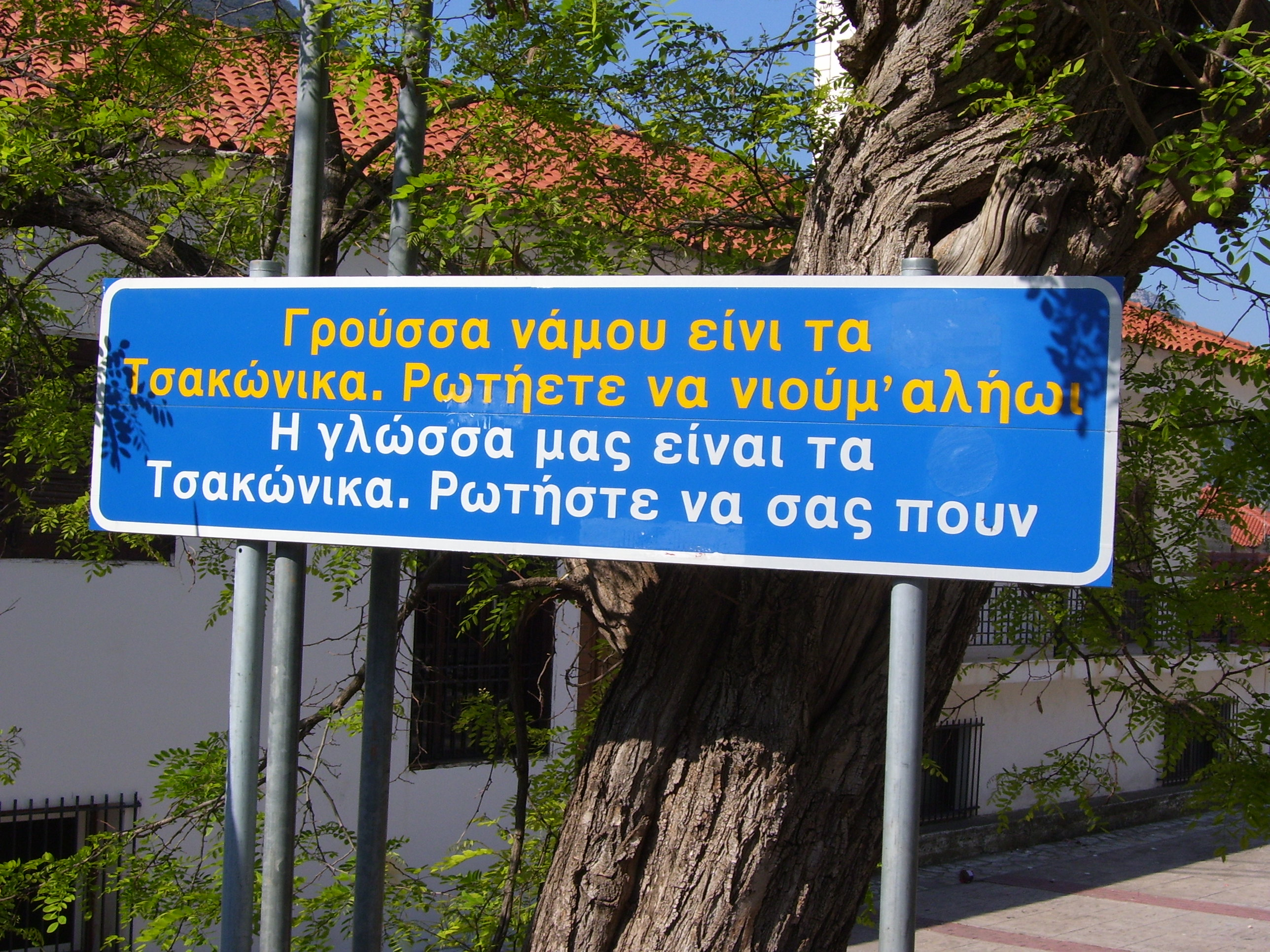
Tsakonian: Γρούσσα νάμου είνι τα Τσακώνικα. Ρωτήετε να νιούμ΄ αλήωι. Standard Greek: Η γλώσσα μας είναι τα Τσακώνικα. Ρωτήστε να σας πουν. "Our language is Tsakonian. Ask people to speak it with you". A bilingual (Tsakonian and Standard Greek) sign.

The term Tsakonas or Tzakonas first emerges in the writings of Byzantine chroniclers who derive the ethnonym from a corruption of Lakonas, a Laconian/Lacedaemonian (Spartan)—a reference to the Doric roots of the Tsakonian language and the people's very late conversion to Christianity in the 9th century and practice of traditional Hellenic customs, a fact which correlated with their isolation from mainstream medieval Greek society. What is often considered the first reference to Tsakonians is a note from around 950 by Constantine Porphyrogenitus in his De Arte Imperiando, "the inhabitants of the district of Maina... are of the older Greeks, who are to this day called Hellenes (pagans) by the locals for being pagans in time past and worshippers of idols, like the Hellenes of old, and were baptised and became Christians during the reign of the late Basil (867–886)", with Maina in his usage typically interpreted to instead mean Tsakonia.

The Tsakonians are thought to have been often border guards in the Byzantine military, judging by the number of references to τζάκωνες and τζέκωνες playing such roles in Byzantine Greek writings. The first reference to their "barbaric" speech being unintelligible to Koine Greek dates to the 15th century.

According to the Byzantine historian George Pachymeres, some Tsakonians were resettled by the Byzantine emperor Michael VIII Palaiologos in Propontis. This was part of their compensation for serving as marines in the Byzantine Navy. They and the Peloponnesian Gasmouloi, who served in the same role, were dismissed from service by Michael's successor, Andronicus II, who made large reductions in the naval force, preferring to rely on Genoese mercenaries. They lived in the villages of Vatka and Havoutsi, where the Gösen River (Aesepus) empties into the sea. However, based on the preservation of features common to both Propontis and the Peloponnesian dialects, Prof. Thanasis Costakis thinks that the date of settlement must have been several centuries later. The community remained there until the 1923 population exchange between Greece and Turkey, when its members were scattered throughout multiple villages in Greek Macedonia.

== Population ==
Tsakonians
Total population
- c. 8,321 (2011 Greek census)

Regions with significant populations
- Greece, United States, Australia

Languages
- Modern Koine and Tsakonian Greek

Religion
- Until c. 9th century: Ancient Greek religion; from c. 9th century to present: Greek Orthodox Christianity

Related ethnic groups
- Maniots and other Greeks

The Tsakonians (Greek: Τσάκωνες Tsákones) are a Greek ethnolinguistic group who historically speak the Tsakonian language and have certain peculiar cultural traditions, such as the Tsakonian dance. Today, the language is critically endangered.

Tsakonians in later times were known for their masonry skills; many were also shepherds. A common practice was for a small crew of men under a mastora to leave their village after the feast of Saint Demetrius and to return at Easter. They would travel as far as Attica doing repairs and white-washing houses. The Tsakonian village of Kastanitsa was known for its chestnuts and derives its name from the Greek word for the nut.

== Genetic studies ==
The paper "Genetics of the peloponnesean populations and the theory of extinction of the medieval peloponnesean Greeks" (2017) studied the Tsakonians under two groups; one from the South (15 samples) and one from the North (9 samples) of the region. Both populations have a very high average pairwise IBD sharing of 0.66% of their genome, or 94 cM, and every pair of individuals shares at least one IBD segment. Tsakonians possess low levels of common ancestry with the Slavs (Belarusians, Russians, Polish, and Ukrainians) at 0.2%–0.9% for Southern Tsakonians and at 3.9%–8.2% for Northern Tsakonians. The rest of the Peloponnesians (148 samples - excluding the Maniots), even though possessing low levels of common ancestry with the Slavs as well, they are still relatively higher than that of Tsakonians (and Maniots) at 4.8%–14.4%. Even though Maniots, divided under the groupings of Deep Mani or Mesa/Inner Mani (22 samples), West Taygetos or Exo/Outer Mani (24 samples), and East Taygetos or Kato/Lower Mani (23 samples), are similarly conservative at 0.7%–1.6%, 4.9%–8.6%, and 5.7%–10.9% of common ancestry with the Slavs respectively, Tsakonians remain a distinct population from both the Maniots and the rest of the Peloponnesians, something that is attributed to isolation by distance and the possibility that Tsakonia in antiquity was inhabited by Doric-speaking Ionians (per Herodotus), while Mani by actual Dorians.

== Sources ==
- Nicholas, Nick (2019). "A critical lexicostatistical examination of Ancient and Modern Greek and Tsakonian". Journal of Applied Linguistics and Lexicography. 1 (1): 18–68. doi:10.33910/2687-0215-2019-1-1-18-68.
- Chrēstos D. Petakos (2003). Chrēstu D. Petaku "Tsakonia": psēphida ellēnikē istorias kai politismu. Zacharopulos. ISBN 978-960-91690-1-1.
- Hawes, Charles H. "Some Dorian Descendants?." The Annual of the British School at Athens 16 (1910): 258-280.
- Costakis, Thanasis P. "Vatika kai Chavoutsi ta tsakonochoria tes Propontidas." (1979).
- Bagenas, Thanos K. Thanu K. Bagena Historika Tsakōnias kai Leōnidiu. 1971.
- Pitsios, Th K. "Anthropologische Untersuchung der Bevölkerung des Peloponnes unter besonderer Berücksichtigung der Arwaniten und Tsakonen." Anthropologischer Anzeiger (1986): 215-225.
