= Sciritis =

Region in ancient Laconia

Sciritis or Skiritis (Ancient Greek: ἡ Σκιρῖτις) was a rugged and barren mountainous district in the north of ancient Laconia, between the upper Eurotas on the west and the Oenus on the east, and extending north of the highest ridge of the mountains, which were the natural boundary between Laconia and Arcadia. The name probably expressed the wild and rugged nature of the country, for the word signified hard and rugged (σκίρον, σκεῖρον, σκληρόν, Hesych). It was bounded by Maenalia on the north, and by Parrhasia on the west, and was originally part of Arcadia, but was conquered at an early period, and its inhabitants reduced to the condition of Lacedaemonian Perioeci. According to Xenophon they were subjected to Sparta even before the time of Lycurgus.

They were distinguished above all the other Perioeci for their bravery; and their contingent, called the Σκιρίτης λόχος, 600 in number, usually occupied the extreme left of the Lacedaemonian wing. They were frequently placed in the post of danger, and sometimes remained with the king as a body of reserve. On the first invasion of Laconia by the Thebans the Sciritae, together with the Perioeci of Caryae and Sellasia, revolted from Sparta, in consequence of which their country was subsequently ravaged by the Lacedaemonians. The only towns in the Sciritis appear to have been Scirus and Oeum called Ium by Xenophon. The latter is the only place in the district mentioned in historical times. Scirus may perhaps have been the same as Scirtonium (Σκιρτώνιον), in the district of Aegytis. The road from Sparta to Tegea led through the Sciritis.
