= Ancient Africa =

Ancient history of the African region

The ancient history of Africa spans from the ancient period until the medieval and early modern period in the history of Africa. (Note: There is no agreed upon periodisation for African history, with the different temporal stages of state formation providing disagreement. The European terms "ancient", "medieval", and "modern" have been criticised as failing to represent African realities and capture its complexity.)

== Antiquity ==
The ancient history of North Africa is inextricably linked to that of the Ancient Near East. This is particularly true of Ancient Egypt and Nubia. In the Horn of Africa the Kingdom of Aksum ruled modern-day Eritrea, northern Ethiopia and the coastal area of the western part of the Arabian Peninsula. The Ancient Egyptians established ties with the Land of Punt in 2,350 BC. Punt was a trade partner of Ancient Egypt and it is believed that it was located in modern-day Somalia, Djibouti or Eritrea. Phoenician cities such as Carthage were part of the Mediterranean Iron Age and classical antiquity. Sub-Saharan Africa developed more or less independently in those times.

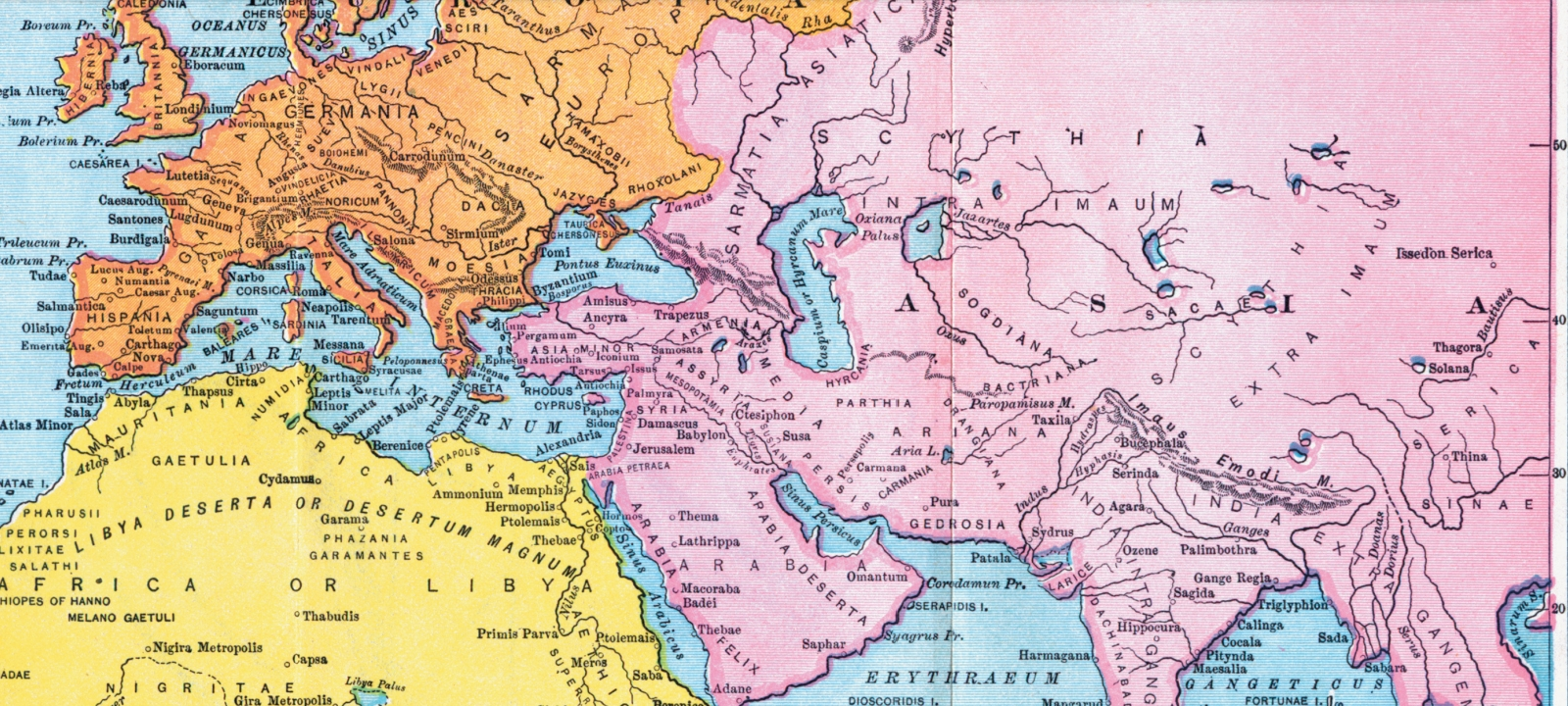
Ancient Africa known to the Ancients

=== Ancient Egypt ===
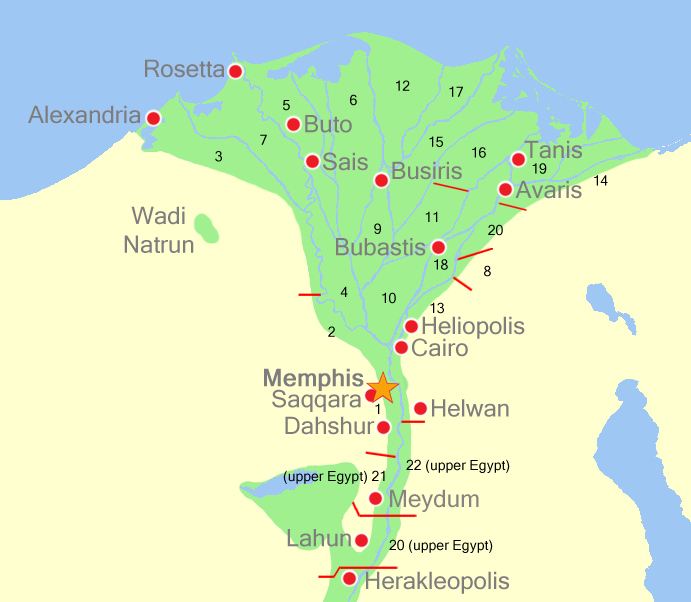
Map of Ancient Egypt and nomes

Mainstream scholars have situated the ethnicity and the origins of predynastic, southern Egypt as a foundational community primarily in northeast Africa which included the Sudan, tropical Africa and the Sahara whilst recognising the population variability that became characteristic of the pharaonic period. Pharaonic Egypt featured a physical gradation across the regional populations, with Upper Egyptians having shared more biological affinities with Sudanese and southernly African populations, whereas Lower Egyptians had closer genetic links with Levantine and Mediterranean populations.

After the desertification of the Sahara, settlement became concentrated in the Nile Valley, where numerous sacral chiefdoms appeared. The regions with the largest population pressure were in the Nile Delta region of Lower Egypt, in Upper Egypt, and also along the second and third cataracts of the Dongola Reach of the Nile in Nubia. This population pressure and growth was brought about by the cultivation of southwest Asian crops, including wheat and barley, and the raising of sheep, goats, and cattle. Population growth led to competition for farm land and the need to regulate farming. Regulation was established by the formation of bureaucracies among sacral chiefdoms. The first and most powerful of the chiefdoms was Ta-Seti, founded around 3,500 BC. The idea of sacral chiefdom spread throughout Upper and Lower Egypt.

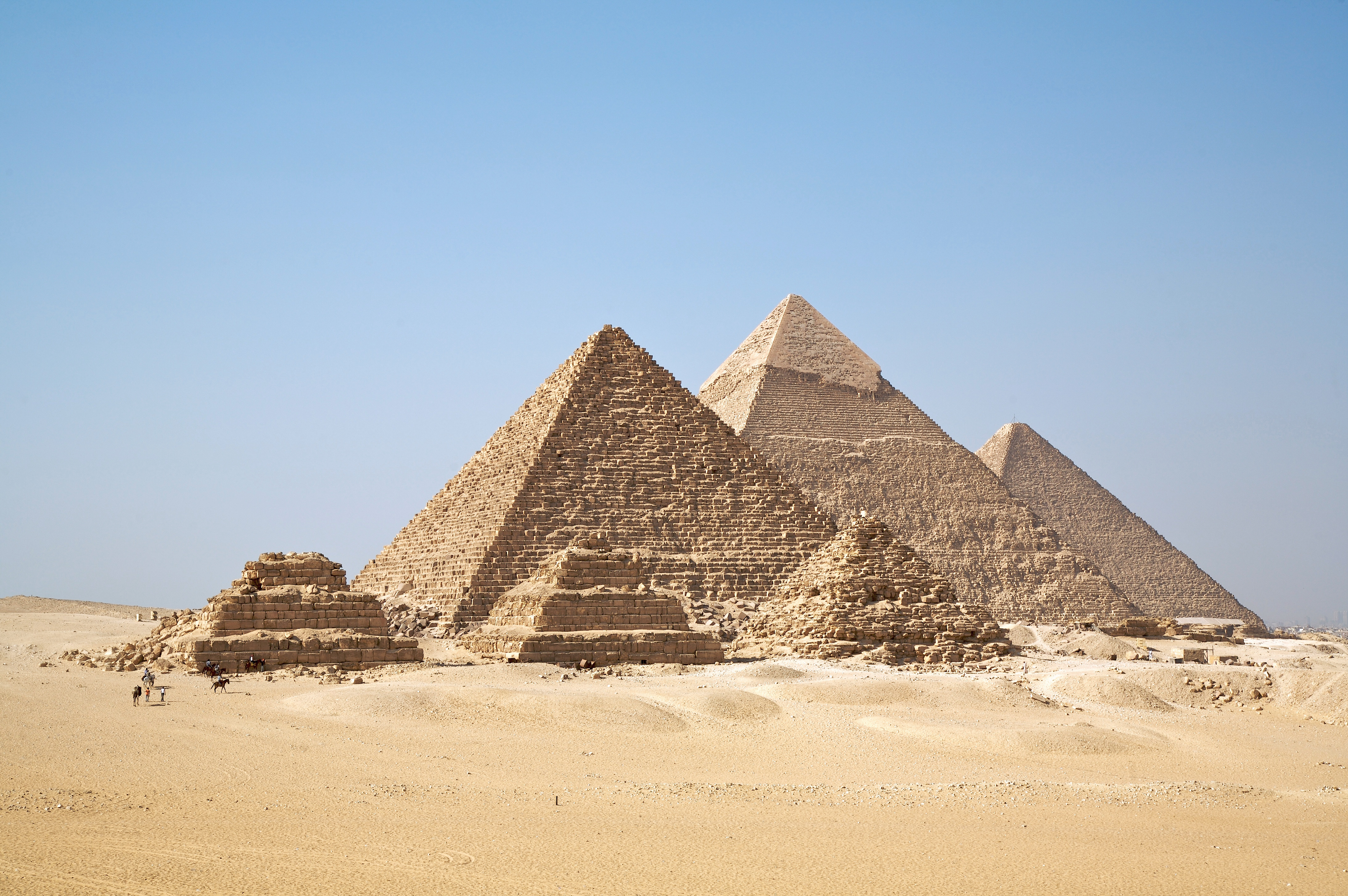
The pyramids of Giza, symbols of the civilization of ancient Egypt

Later consolidation of the chiefdoms into broader political entities began to occur in Upper and Lower Egypt, culminating into the unification of Egypt into one political entity by Narmer (Menes) in 3,100 BC. Instead of being viewed as a sacral chief, he became a divine king. The henotheism, or worship of a single god within a polytheistic system, practiced in the sacral chiefdoms along Upper and Lower Egypt, became the polytheistic Ancient Egyptian religion. Bureaucracies became more centralized under the pharaohs, run by viziers, governors, tax collectors, generals, artists, and technicians. They engaged in tax collecting, organizing of labor for major public works, and building irrigation systems, pyramids, temples, and canals. During the Fourth Dynasty (2,620–2,480 BC), long-distance trade was developed, with the Levant for timber, with Nubia for gold and skins, with Punt for frankincense, and also with the western Libyan territories. For most of the Old Kingdom, Egypt developed her fundamental systems, institutions and culture, always through the central bureaucracy and by the divinity of the Pharaoh.

After the fourth millennium BC, Egypt started to extend direct military and political control over her southern and western neighbors. By 2,200 BC, the Old Kingdom's stability was undermined by rivalry among the governors of the nomes who challenged the power of pharaohs and by invasions of Asiatics into the Nile Delta. The First Intermediate Period had begun, a time of political division and uncertainty.

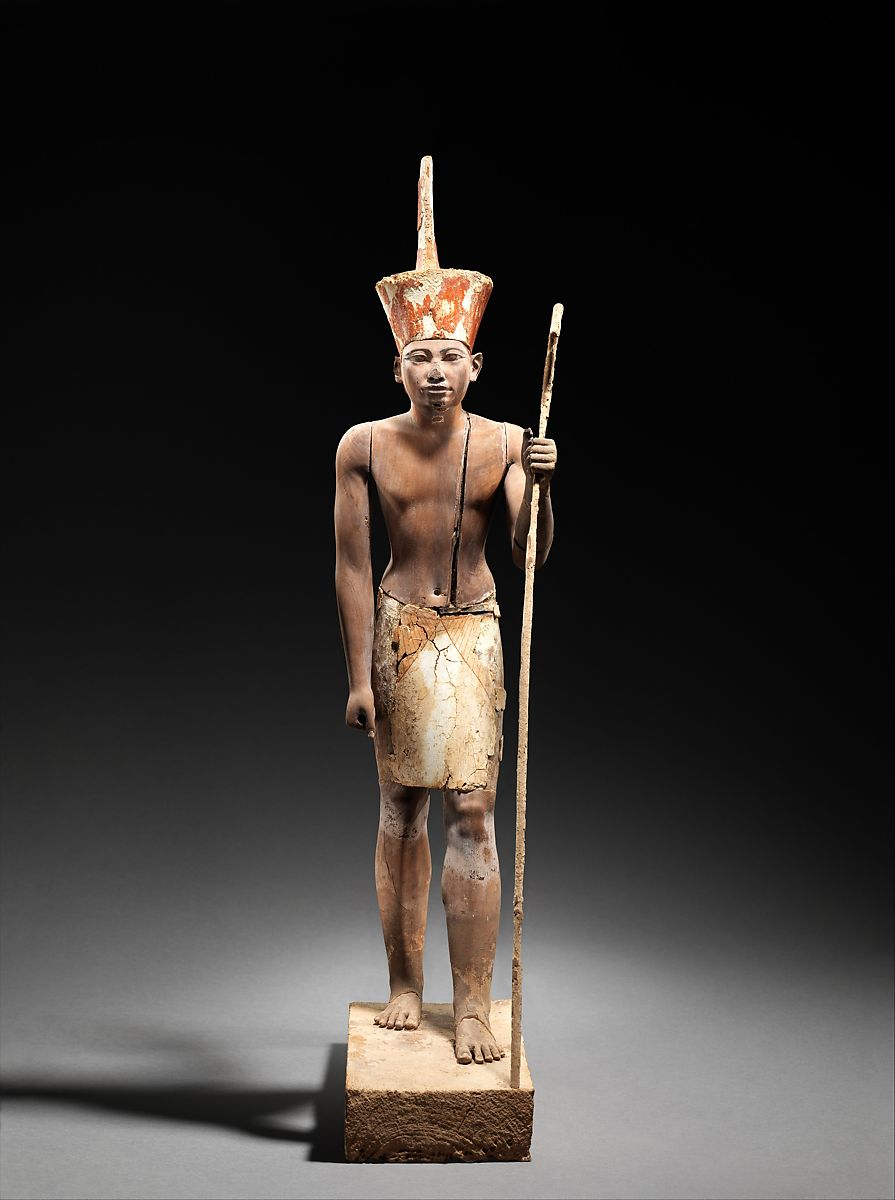
A figure wearing the red crown of Lower Egypt, most probably Amenemhat II or Senwosret II

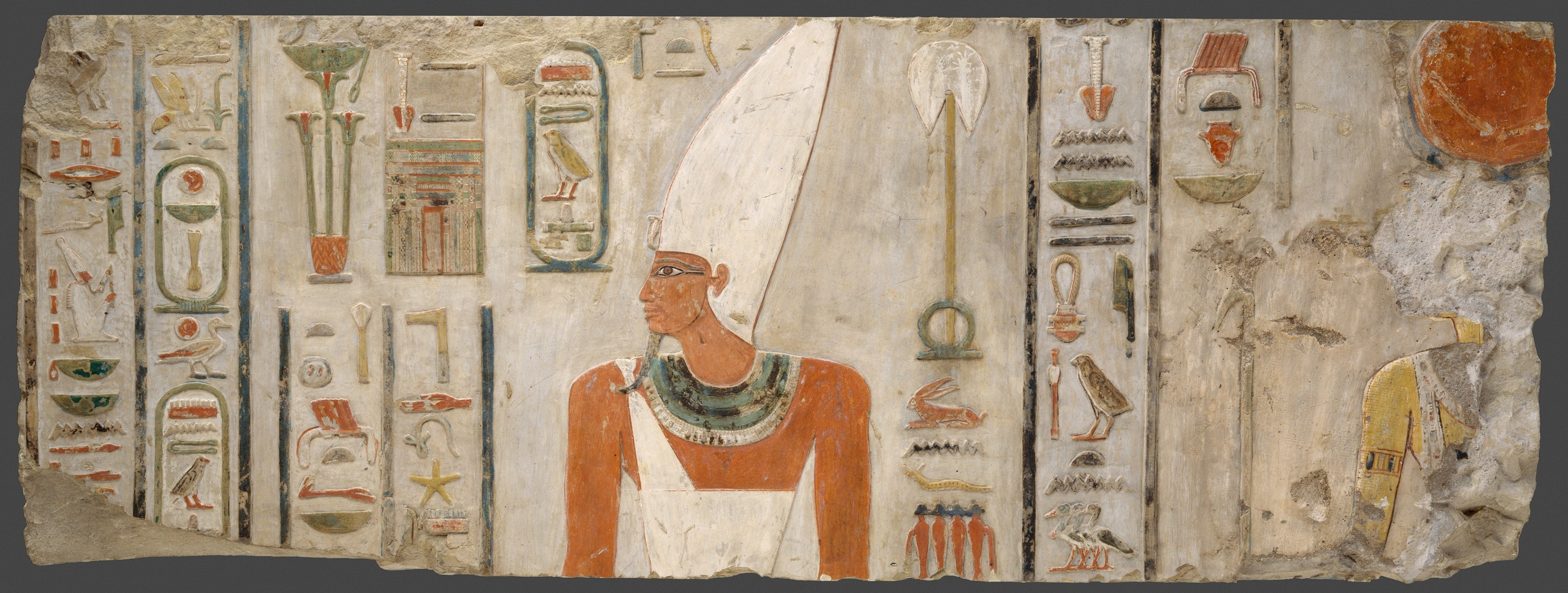
A painted relief depicting pharaoh Mentuhotep II, from his mortuary temple at Deir el-Bahari

Middle Kingdom of Egypt arose when Mentuhotep II of Eleventh Dynasty unified Egypt once again between 2041 and 2016 BC beginning with his conquering of Tenth Dynasty in 2041 BC. Pyramid building resumed, long-distance trade re-emerged, and the center of power moved from Memphis to Thebes. Connections with the southern regions of Kush, Wawat and Irthet at the second cataract were made stronger. Then came the Second Intermediate Period, with the invasion of the Hyksos on horse-drawn chariots and utilizing bronze weapons, a technology heretofore unseen in Egypt. Horse-drawn chariots soon spread to the west in the inhabitable Sahara and North Africa. The Hyksos failed to hold on to their Egyptian territories and were absorbed by Egyptian society. This eventually led to one of Egypt's most powerful phases, the New Kingdom (1,580–1,080 BC), with the Eighteenth Dynasty. Egypt became a superpower controlling Nubia and Judea while exerting political influence on the Libyans to the West and on the Mediterranean.

As before, the New Kingdom ended with invasion from the west by Libyan princes, leading to the Third Intermediate Period. Beginning with Shoshenq I, the Twenty-second Dynasty was established. It ruled for two centuries.

To the south, Nubian independence and strength was being reasserted. This reassertion led to the conquest of Egypt by Nubia, begun by Kashta and completed by Piye (Pianhky, 751–730 BC) and Shabaka (716–695 BC). This was the birth of the Twenty-fifth Dynasty of Egypt. The Nubians tried to re-establish Egyptian traditions and customs. They ruled Egypt for a hundred years. This was ended by an Assyrian invasion, with Taharqa experiencing the full might of Assyrian iron weapons. The Nubian pharaoh Tantamani was the last of the Twenty-fifth dynasty.

When the Assyrians and Nubians left, a new Twenty-sixth Dynasty emerged from Sais. It lasted until 525 BC, when Egypt was invaded by the Persians. Unlike the Assyrians, the Persians stayed. In 332, Egypt was conquered by Alexander the Great. This was the beginning of the Ptolemaic dynasty, which ended with Roman conquest in 30 BC. Pharaonic Egypt had come to an end.

=== Nubia ===
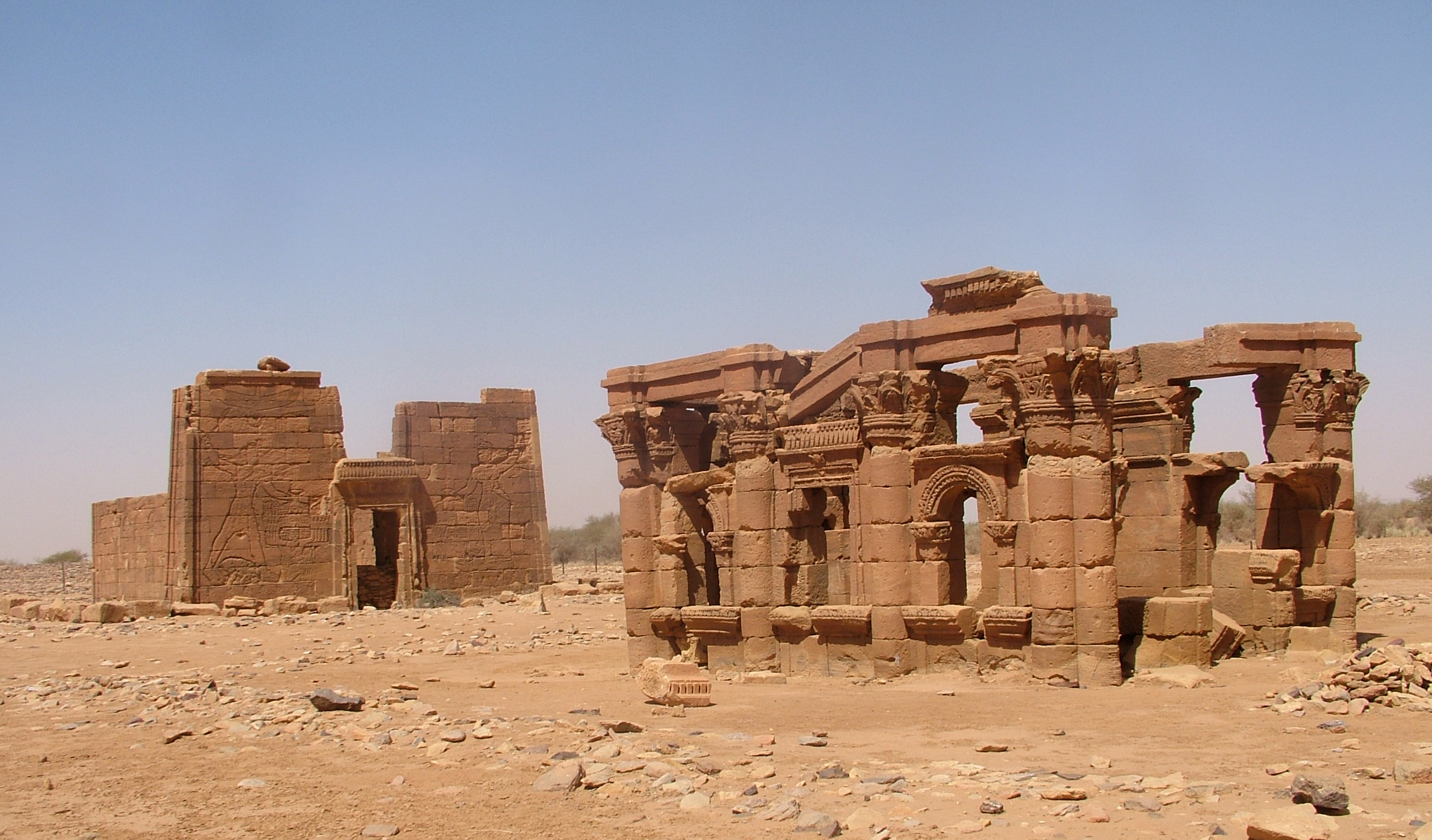
Nubian Temple of Apedemak, Naqa

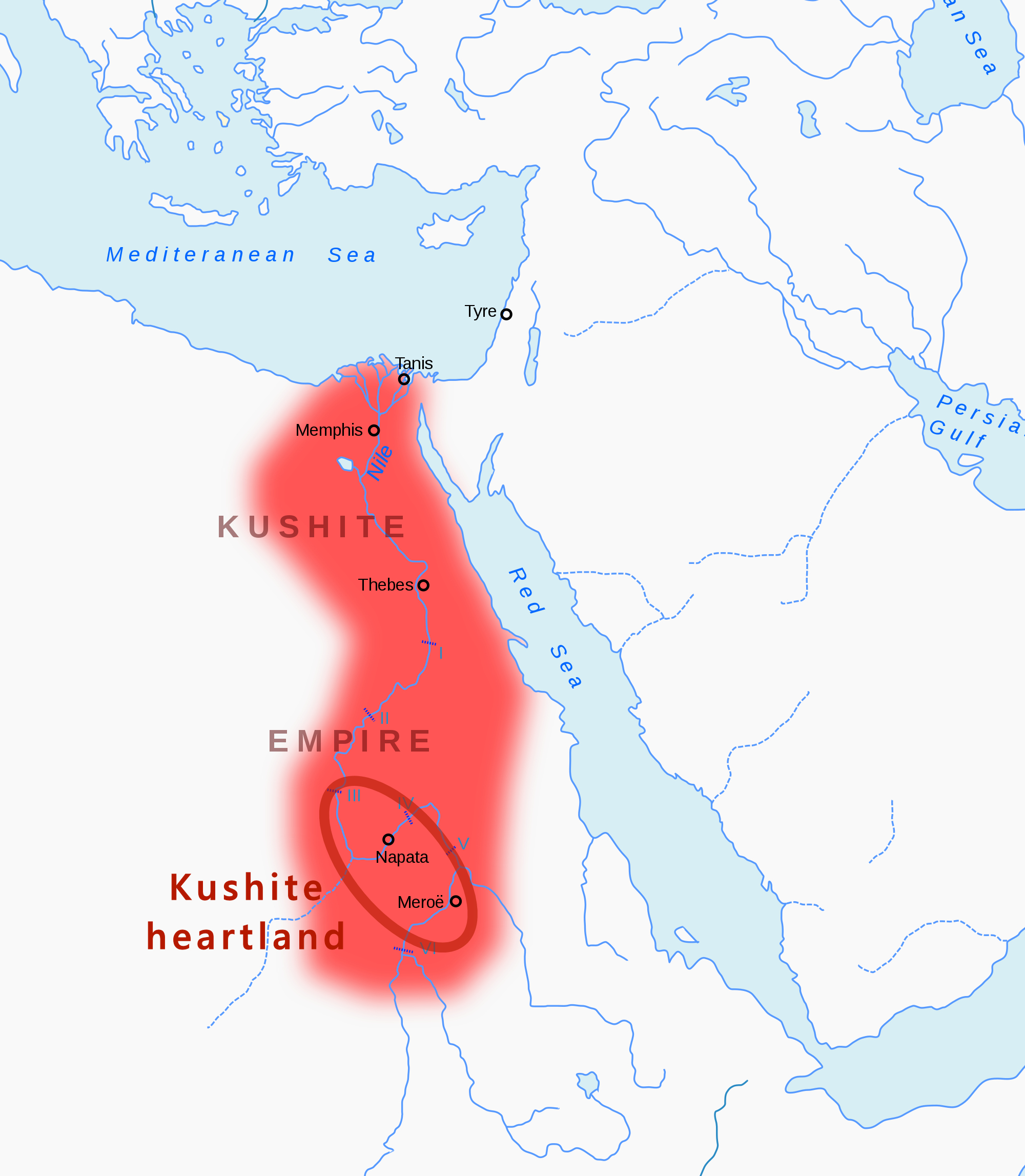
Nubian Empire at its greatest extent

Nubia, situated along the Nile River in what is now southern Egypt and northern Sudan, was home to a series of complex societies and kingdoms that played significant roles in the ancient world.

The earliest known culture in Nubia is the A-Group, flourishing between approximately 3800 and 3100 BCE. This culture developed out of Neolithic societies and is recognized for its cemeteries, artifacts, and rock art found between the First and Second Cataracts of the Nile. The A-Group engaged in trade with ancient Egypt, exchanging goods such as gold, copper, and ivory. The term "Ta-Seti," meaning "Land of the Bow," was used by ancient Egyptians to refer to Nubia, highlighting the region's reputation for skilled archers. Some scholars associate Ta-Seti with the A-Group culture, though the exact relationship remains a subject of debate.

Around 2500 BCE, the Kingdom of Kerma emerged as a powerful Nubian state centered near the Third Cataract of the Nile. Kerma became a significant rival to Egypt, controlling territory from the Second to the Fourth Cataracts. The city of Kerma featured monumental architecture, including a large mudbrick temple and extensive cemeteries. During the Second Intermediate Period of Egypt (circa 1650–1550 BCE), Kerma allied with the Hyksos, who controlled parts of northern Egypt. This alliance posed a substantial threat to the Egyptian state. However, the rise of Egypt's New Kingdom led to military campaigns that eventually subdued Kerma by around 1500 BCE.

Following the decline of Kerma, the Kingdom of Kush rose to prominence, with its initial capital at Napata, near the Fourth Cataract. By the 8th century BCE, Kushite kings had extended their influence into Egypt. King Piye (also known as Piankhi) successfully invaded Egypt around 730 BCE, establishing the 25th Dynasty and ruling as Pharaoh. The Kushite Dynasty embraced many aspects of Egyptian culture, including religion, art, and architecture. However, their rule in Egypt faced challenges from the expanding Neo-Assyrian Empire. In 663 BCE, Assyrian forces led by King Ashurbanipal sacked Thebes, effectively ending Kushite control over Egypt.

After retreating from Egypt, the Kushite kingdom shifted its capital to Meroë, located further south along the Nile. This move marked the beginning of the Meroitic Period, characterized by a distinct Nubian culture that, while influenced by Egypt, developed unique features. Meroë became a center for iron production and trade, with connections extending to the Red Sea and the Mediterranean. The Meroitic script, an indigenous writing system, replaced Egyptian hieroglyphs during this era. The Meroitic religion incorporated Egyptian deities and introduced new ones, such as the lion-headed god Apedemak. Art and architecture from this period display a blend of Egyptian and indigenous Nubian elements.

By the 4th century CE, the Kingdom of Kush faced decline due to internal factors and external pressures. Around 350 CE, King Ezana of Aksum, a rising power in what is now Ethiopia, launched a successful military campaign against Meroë, leading to the fall of the Kushite kingdom.

=== Carthage ===
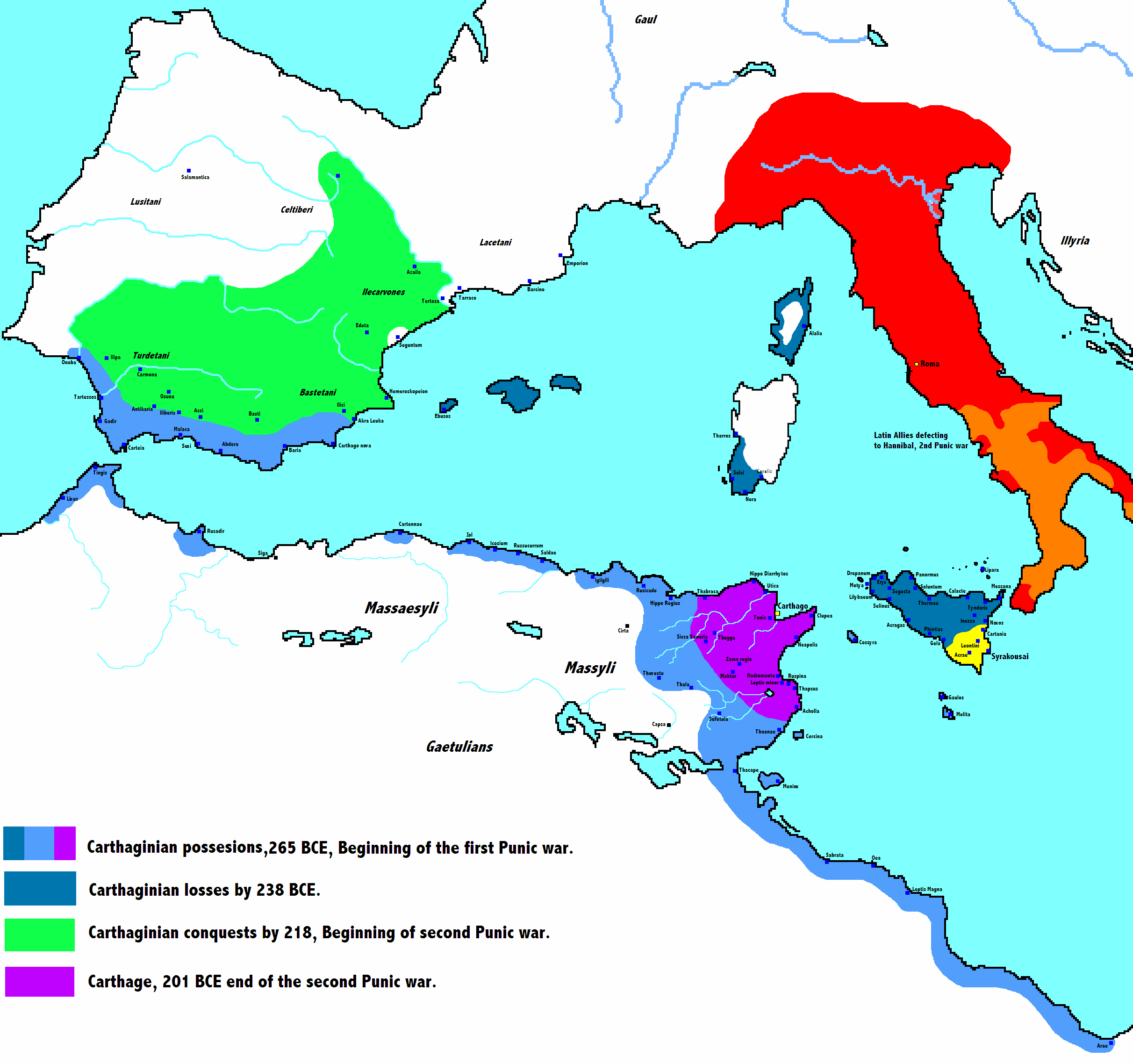
Carthaginian Empire

The Egyptians referred to the people west of the Nile, ancestral to the Berbers, as Libyans. The Libyans were agriculturalists like the Mauri of Morocco and the Numidians of central and eastern Algeria and Tunis. They were also nomadic, having the horse, and occupied the arid pastures and desert, like the Gaetuli. Berber desert nomads were typically in conflict with Berber coastal agriculturalists.

The Phoenicians were Mediterranean seamen in constant search for valuable metals such as copper, gold, tin, and lead. They began to populate the North African coast with settlements—trading and mixing with the native Berber population. In 814 BC, Phoenicians from Tyre established the city of Carthage. By 600 BC, Carthage had become a major trading entity and power in the Mediterranean, largely through trade with tropical Africa. Carthage's prosperity fostered the growth of the Berber kingdoms, Numidia and Mauretania. Around 500 BC, Carthage provided a strong impetus for trade with Sub-Saharan Africa. Berber middlemen, who had maintained contacts with Sub-Saharan Africa since the desert had desiccated, used pack animals to transfer products from oasis to oasis. Danger lurked from the Garamantes of Fez, who raided caravans. Salt and metal goods were traded for gold, slaves, beads, and ivory.

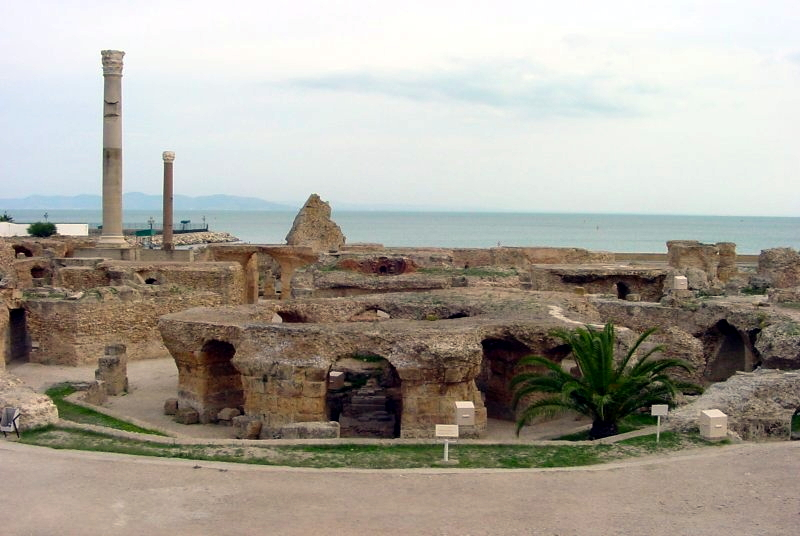
Ruins of Carthage

The Carthaginians were rivals to the Greeks and Romans. Carthage fought the Punic Wars, three wars with Rome: the First Punic War (264 to 241 BC), over Sicily; the Second Punic War (218 to 201 BC), in which Hannibal invaded Europe; and the Third Punic War (149 to 146 BC). Carthage lost the first two wars, and in the third it was destroyed, becoming the Roman province of Africa, with the Berber Kingdom of Numidia assisting Rome. The Roman province of Africa became a major agricultural supplier of wheat, olives, and olive oil to imperial Rome via exorbitant taxation. Two centuries later, Rome brought the Berber kingdoms of Numidia and Mauretania under its authority. In the 420's AD, Vandals invaded North Africa and Rome lost her territories, subsequently the Berber kingdoms regained their independence.

Christianity gained a foothold in Africa at Alexandria in the 1st century AD and spread to Northwest Africa. By 313 AD, with the Edict of Milan, all of Roman North Africa was Christian. Egyptians adopted Monophysite Christianity and formed the independent Coptic Church. Berbers adopted Donatist Christianity. Both groups refused to accept the authority of the Roman Catholic Church.

==== Role of the Berbers ====
As Carthaginian power grew, its impact on the indigenous population increased dramatically. Berber civilization was already at a stage in which agriculture, manufacturing, trade, and political organization supported several states. Trade links between Carthage and the Berbers in the interior grew, but territorial expansion also resulted in the enslavement or military recruitment of some Berbers and in the extraction of tribute from others. By the early 4th century BC, Berbers formed one of the largest element, with Gauls, of the Carthaginian army.

In the Mercenary War (241-238 BC), a rebellion was instigated by mercenary soldiers of Carthage and African allies. Berber soldiers participated after being unpaid following the defeat of Carthage in the First Punic War. Berbers succeeded in obtaining control of much of Carthage's North African territory, and they minted coins bearing the name Libyan, used in Greek to describe natives of North Africa. The Carthaginian state declined because of successive defeats by the Romans in the Punic Wars; in 146 BC the city of Carthage was destroyed. As Carthaginian power waned, the influence of Berber leaders in the hinterland grew. By the 2nd century BC, several large but loosely administered Berber kingdoms had emerged. Two of them were established in Numidia, behind the coastal areas controlled by Carthage. West of Numidia lay Mauretania, which extended across the Moulouya River in Morocco to the Atlantic Ocean. The high point of Berber civilization, unequaled until the coming of the Almohads and Almoravid dynasty more than a millennium later, was reached during the reign of Masinissa in the 2nd century BC. After Masinissa's death in 148 BC, the Berber kingdoms were divided and reunited several times. Masinissa's line survived until 24 AD, when the remaining Berber territory was annexed to the Roman Empire.

=== Macrobia and the Barbari City States ===
Reconstruction of the Oikumene (inhabited world) as described by Herodotus in the 5th century BC.

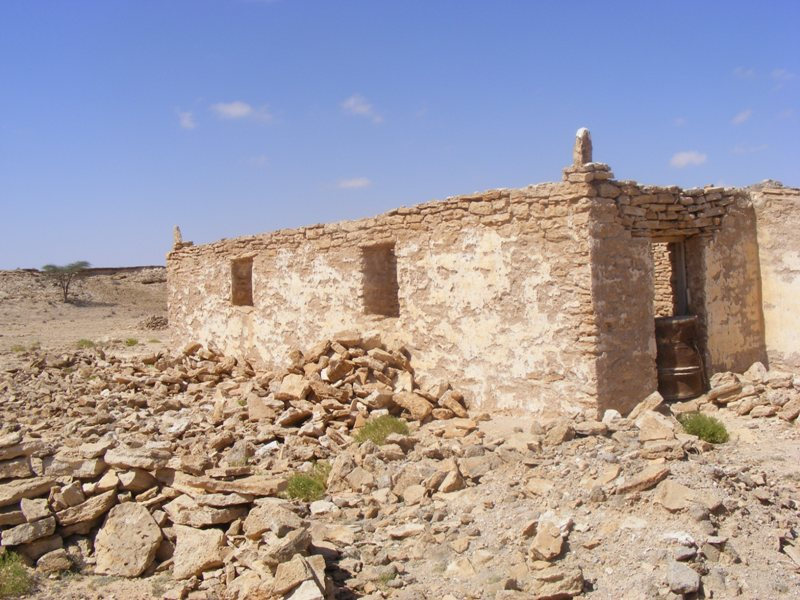
Ruins of Qa'ableh, an early center of Somali civilization

Macrobia was an ancient kingdom situated in the Horn of Africa (present day Somalia). It is mentioned in the 5th century BC. According to Herodotus' account, the Persian Emperor Cambyses II upon his conquest of Egypt (525 BC) sent ambassadors to Macrobia, bringing luxury gifts for the Macrobian king to entice his submission. The Macrobian ruler, who was elected based at least in part on stature, replied instead with a challenge for his Persian counterpart in the form of an unstrung bow: if the Persians could manage to string it, they would have the right to invade his country; but until then, they should thank the gods that the Macrobians never decided to invade their empire.

The Macrobians were a regional power reputed for their advanced architecture and gold wealth, which was so plentiful that they shackled their prisoners in golden chains.

After the collapse of Macrobia, several wealthy ancient city-states, such as Opone, Essina, Sarapion, Nikon, Malao, Damo and Mosylon near Cape Guardafui would emerge from the 1st millennium BC–500 AD to compete with the Sabaeans, Parthians and Axumites for the wealthy Indo-Greco-Roman trade and flourished along the Somali coast. They developed a lucrative trading network under a region collectively known in the Peripilus of the Erythraean Sea as Barbaria.

=== Roman North Africa ===
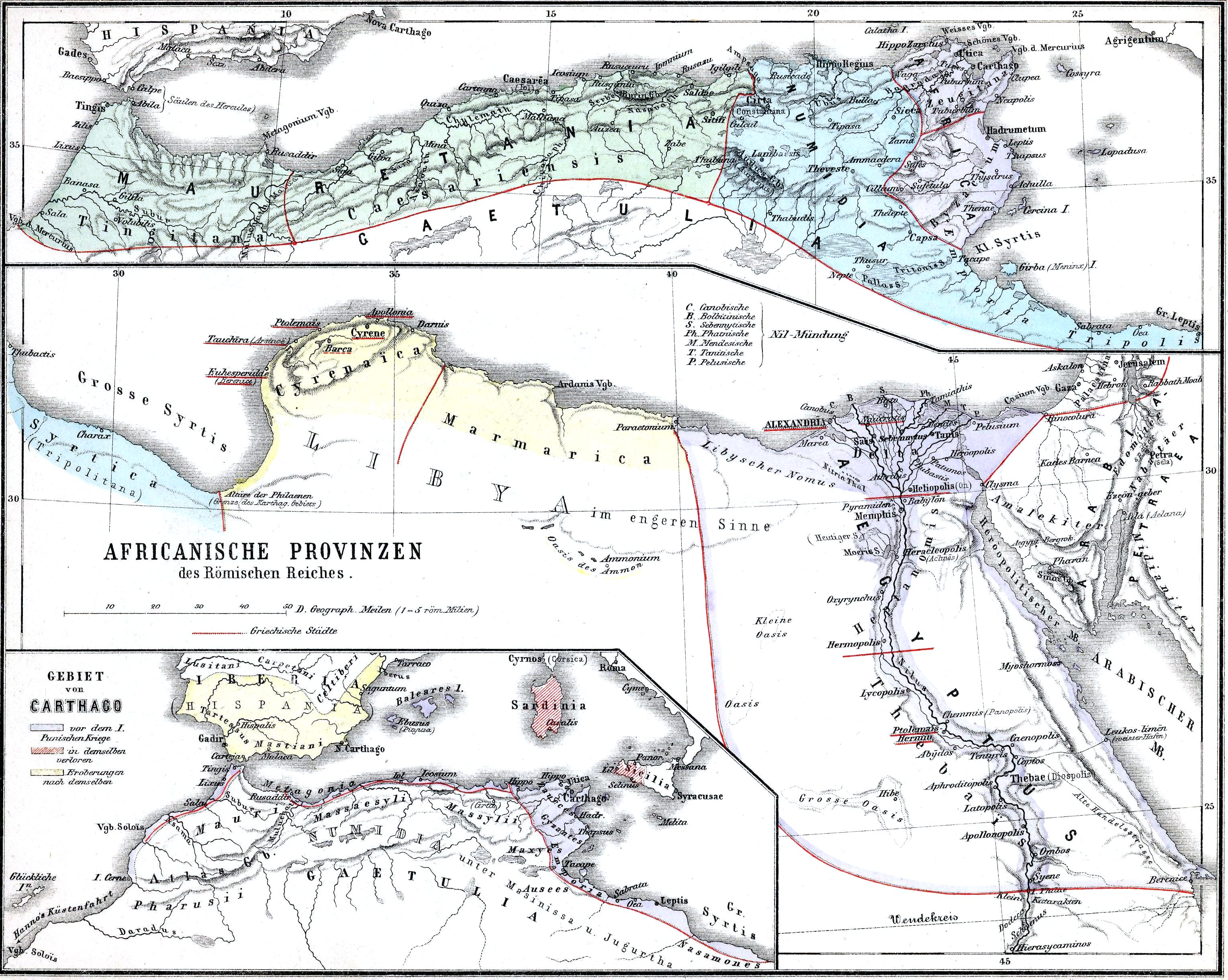
Northern Africa under Roman rule

"Increases in urbanization and in the area under cultivation during Roman rule caused wholesale dislocations of the Berber society, forcing nomad tribes to settle or to move from their traditional rangelands. Sedentary tribes lost their autonomy and connection with the land. Berber opposition to the Roman presence was nearly constant. The Roman emperor Trajan established a frontier in the south by encircling the Aurès and Nemencha mountains and building a line of forts from Vescera (modern Biskra) to Ad Majores (Henchir Besseriani, southeast of Biskra). The defensive line extended at least as far as Castellum Dimmidi (modern Messaâd, southwest of Biskra), Roman Algeria's southernmost fort. Romans settled and developed the area around Sitifis (modern Sétif) in the 2nd century, but farther west the influence of Rome did not extend beyond the coast and principal military roads until much later."

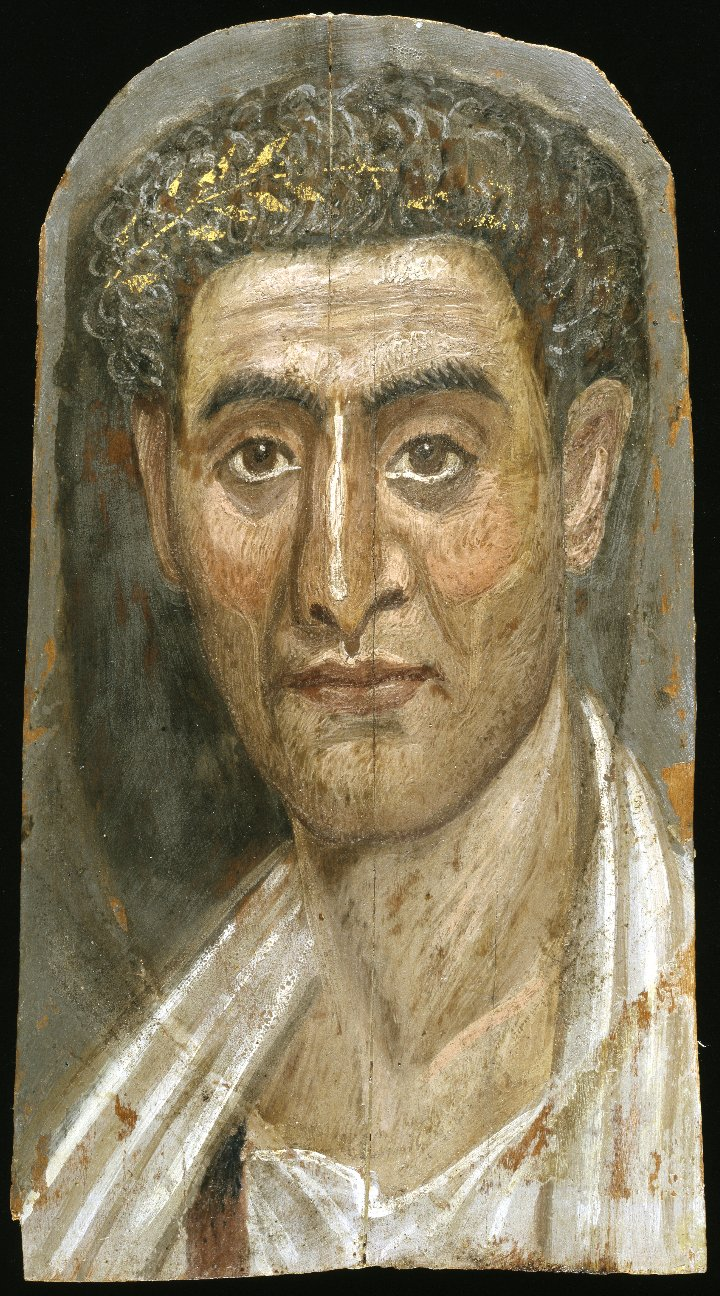
Fayum mummy portrait of Demetrios, a citizen of Roman Egypt, c. 100 AD, Brooklyn Museum

The Roman military presence of North Africa remained relatively small, consisting of about 28,000 troops and auxiliaries in Numidia and the two Mauretanian provinces. Starting in the 2nd century AD, these garrisons were manned mostly by local inhabitants.

Aside from Carthage, urbanization in North Africa came in part with the establishment of settlements of veterans under the Roman emperors Claudius (reigned 41–54), Nerva (96–98), and Trajan (98–117). In Algeria such settlements included Tipasa, Cuicul or Curculum (modern Djemila, northeast of Sétif), Thamugadi (modern Timgad, southeast of Sétif), and Sitifis (modern Sétif). The prosperity of most towns depended on agriculture. Called the "granary of the empire", North Africa became one of the largest exporters of grain in the empire, shipping to the provinces which did not produce cereals, like Italy and Greece. Other crops included fruit, figs, grapes, and beans. By the 2nd century AD, olive oil rivaled cereals as an export item.

The beginnings of the Roman imperial decline seemed less serious in North Africa than elsewhere. However, uprisings did take place. In 238 AD, landowners rebelled unsuccessfully against imperial fiscal policies. Sporadic tribal revolts in the Mauretanian mountains followed from 253 to 288, during the Crisis of the Third Century. The towns also suffered economic difficulties, and building activity almost ceased.

The towns of Roman North Africa had a substantial Jewish population. Some Jews had been deported from Judea or Palestine in the 1st and 2nd centuries AD for rebelling against Roman rule; others had come earlier with Punic settlers. In addition, a number of Berber tribes had converted to Judaism.

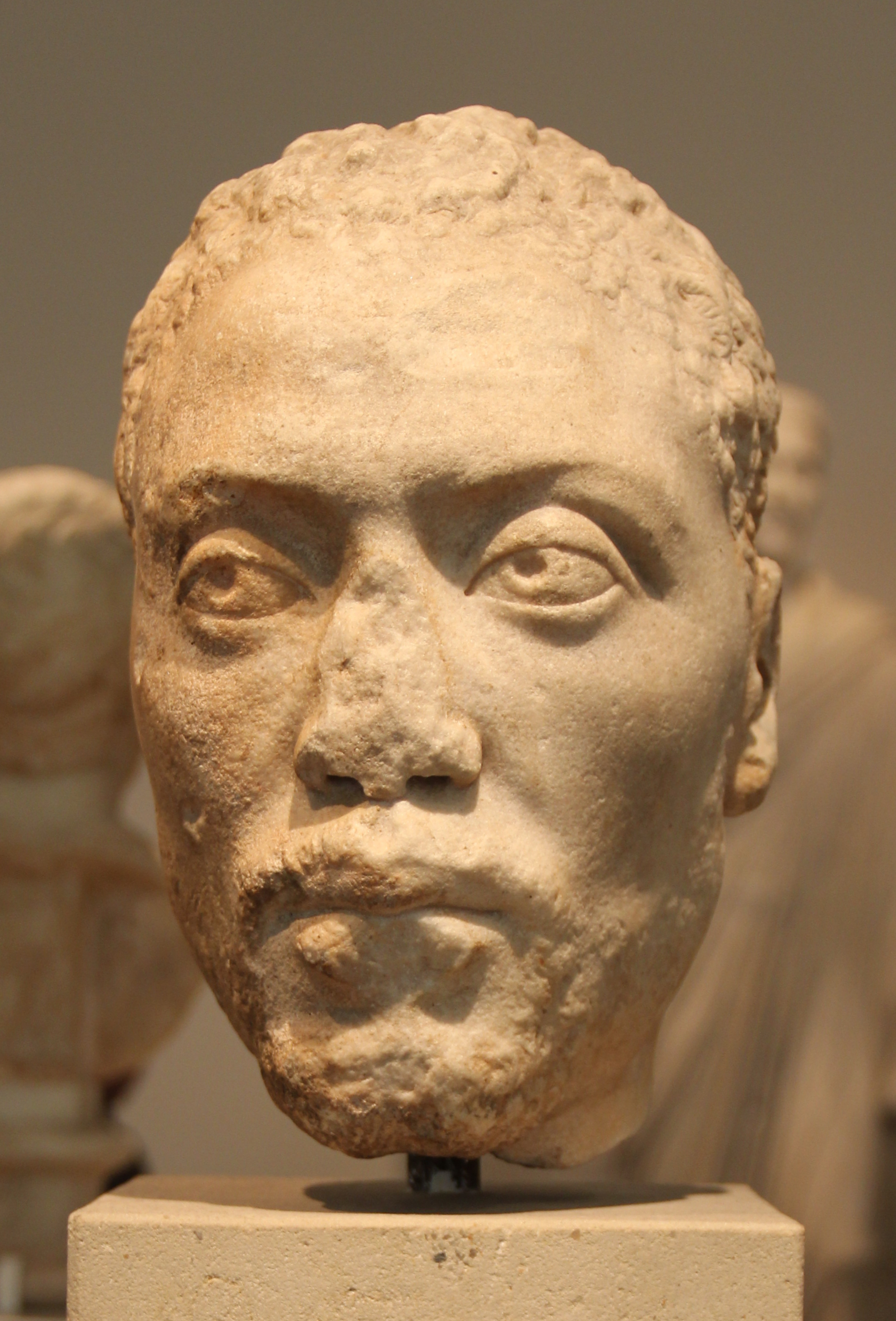
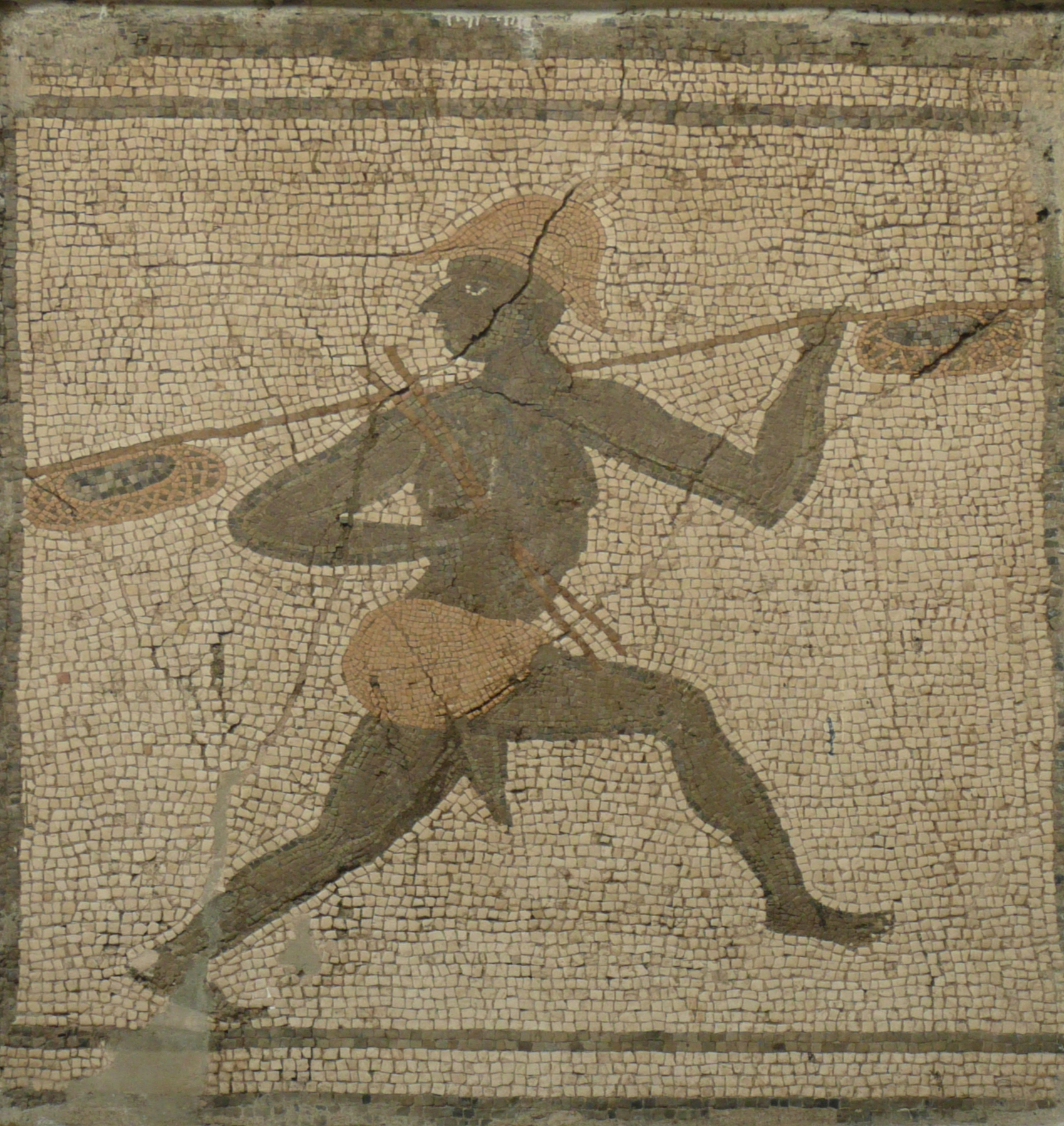
Left: Memnon, foster child of Herodes Atticus; marble bust (showing sub-Saharan facial features), ca. 170 AD, from the Villa of Herodes Atticus at Eva, Arcadia.
Right: an ancient Roman mosaic from Antioch depicting a sub-Saharan African man carrying goods over his shoulder.

Christianity arrived in the 2nd century and soon gained converts in the towns and among slaves. More than eighty bishops, some from distant frontier regions of Numidia, attended the Council of Carthage (256) in 256. By the end of the 4th century, the settled areas had become Christianized, and some Berber tribes had converted en masse.

A division in the church that came to be known as the Donatist heresy began in 313 among Christians in North Africa. The Donatists stressed the holiness of the church and refused to accept the authority to administer the sacraments of those who had surrendered the scriptures when they were forbidden under the Emperor Diocletian (reigned 284–305). The Donatists also opposed the involvement of Constantine the Great (reigned 306–337) in church affairs in contrast to the majority of Christians who welcomed official imperial recognition.

The occasionally violent Donatist controversy has been characterized as a struggle between opponents and supporters of the Roman system. The most articulate North African critic of the Donatist position, which came to be called a heresy, was Augustine, bishop of Hippo Regius. Augustine maintained that the unworthiness of a minister did not affect the validity of the sacraments because their true minister was Jesus Christ. In his sermons and books Augustine, who is considered a leading exponent of Christian dogma, evolved a theory of the right of orthodox Christian rulers to use force against schismatics and heretics. Although the dispute was resolved by a decision of an imperial commission in Carthage in 411, Donatist communities continued to exist as late as the 6th century.

In the 5th century Roman Africa was conquered by the Vandals, preceding the fall of Rome. Swathes of indigenous peoples regained self-governance in the Mauro-Roman Kingdom and its numerous successor polities in the Maghreb, namely the kingdoms of Ouarsenis, Aurès, and Altava.

During the Vandalic War, Belisarius, general of the Byzantine emperor Justinian I based in Constantinople, landed in North Africa in 533 with 16,000 men and within a year destroyed the Vandal Kingdom. Local opposition delayed full Byzantine control of the region for twelve years, however, and when imperial control came, it was but a shadow of the control exercised by Rome. Although an impressive series of fortifications were built, Byzantine rule was compromised by official corruption, incompetence, military weakness, and lack of concern in Constantinople for African affairs, which made it an easy target for the Arabs during the Early Muslim conquests. As a result, many rural areas reverted to Berber rule. The Byzantines and the Berber kingdoms fought minor inconsequential conflicts, such as in the case of Garmul, however largely coexisted.

=== Aksum ===
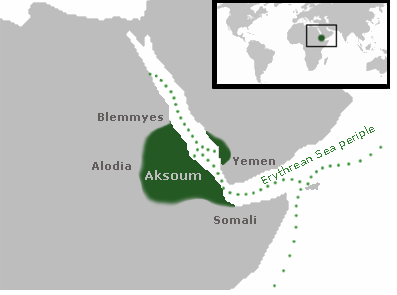
Aksumite Empire

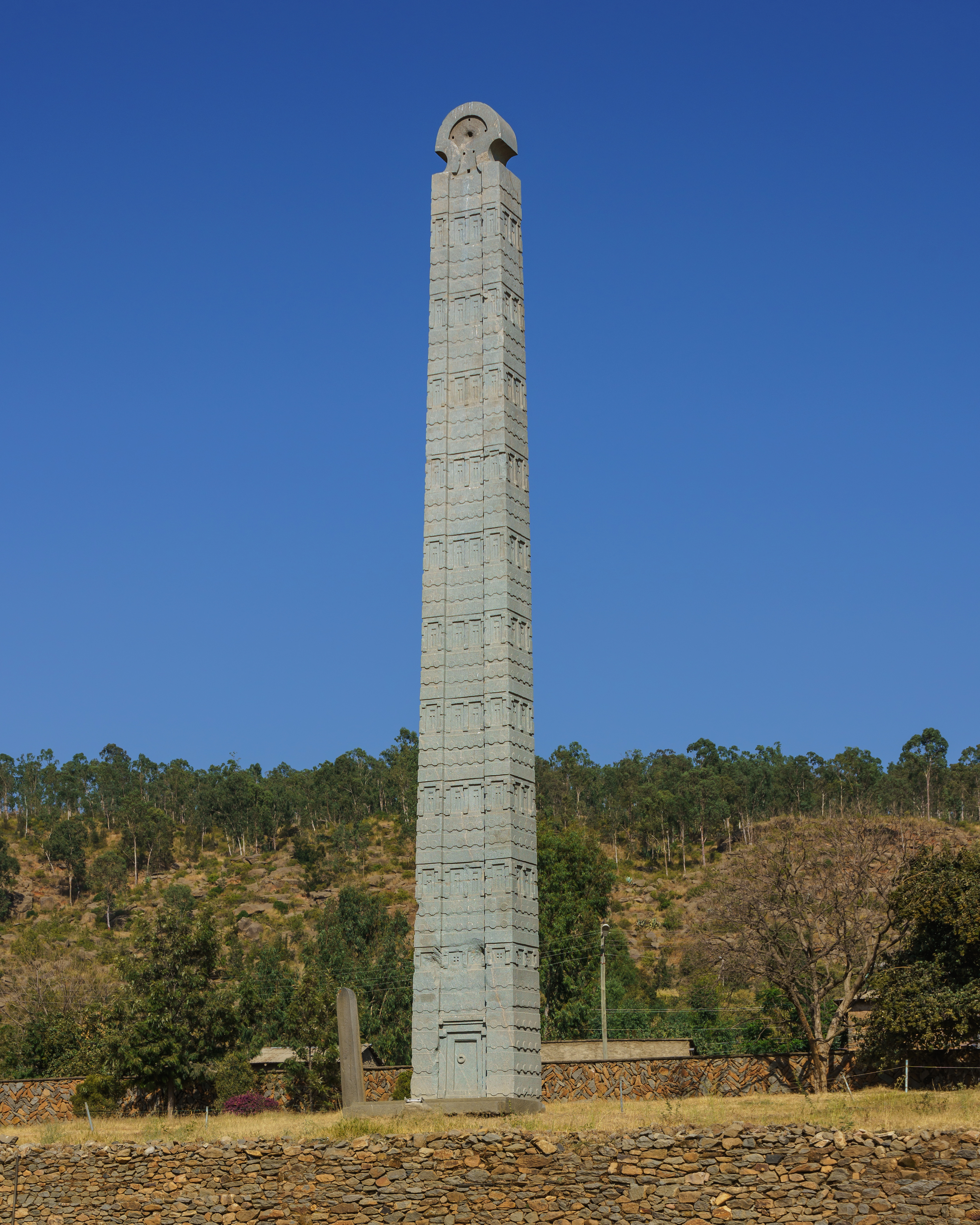
Aksum Obelisk, symbol of the Aksumite civilization

The earliest state in Eritrea and northern Ethiopia, Dʿmt, dates from around the 8th and 7th centuries BC. D'mt traded through the Red Sea with Egypt and the Mediterranean, providing frankincense. By the 5th and 3rd centuries, D'mt had declined, and several successor states took its place. Later there was greater trade with South Arabia, mainly with the port of Saba. Adulis became an important commercial center in the Ethiopian Highlands. The interaction of the peoples in the two regions, the southern Arabia Sabaeans and the northern Ethiopians, resulted in the Ge'ez culture and language and eventual development of the Ge'ez script. Trade links increased and expanded from the Red Sea to the Mediterranean, with Egypt, Israel, Phoenicia, Greece, and Rome, to the Black Sea, and to Persia, India, and China. Aksum was known throughout those lands. By the 5th century BC, the region was very prosperous, exporting ivory, hippopotamus hides, gold dust, spices, and live elephants. It imported silver, gold, olive oil, and wine. Aksum manufactured glass crystal, brass, and copper for export. A powerful Aksum emerged, unifying parts of eastern Sudan, northern Ethiopia (Tigre), and Eritrea. Its kings built stone palatial buildings and were buried under megalithic monuments. By 300 AD, Aksum was minting its own coins in silver and gold.

In 331 AD, King Ezana (320–350 AD) was converted to Miaphysite Christianity which believes in one united divine-human nature of Christ, supposedly by Frumentius and Aedesius, who became stranded on the Red Sea coast. Some scholars believed the process was more complex and gradual than a simple conversion. Around 350, the time Ezana sacked Meroe, the Syrian monastic tradition took root within the Ethiopian church.

In the 6th century Aksum was powerful enough to add Saba on the Arabian peninsula to her empire. At the end of the 6th century, the Sasanian Empire pushed Aksum out of the peninsula. With the spread of Islam through Western Asia and Northern Africa, Aksum's trading networks in the Mediterranean faltered. The Red Sea trade diminished as it was diverted to the Persian Gulf and dominated by Arabs, causing Aksum to decline. By 800 AD, the capital was moved south into the interior highlands, and Aksum was much diminished.

=== West Africa ===
In the western Sahel the rise of settled communities occurred largely as a result of the domestication of millet and of sorghum. Archaeology points to sizable urban populations in West Africa beginning in the 2nd millennium BC. Symbiotic trade relations developed before the trans-Saharan trade, in response to the opportunities afforded by north–south diversity in ecosystems across deserts, grasslands, and forests. The agriculturists received salt from the desert nomads. The desert nomads acquired meat and other foods from pastoralists and farmers of the grasslands and from fishermen on the Niger River. The forest-dwellers provided furs and meat.

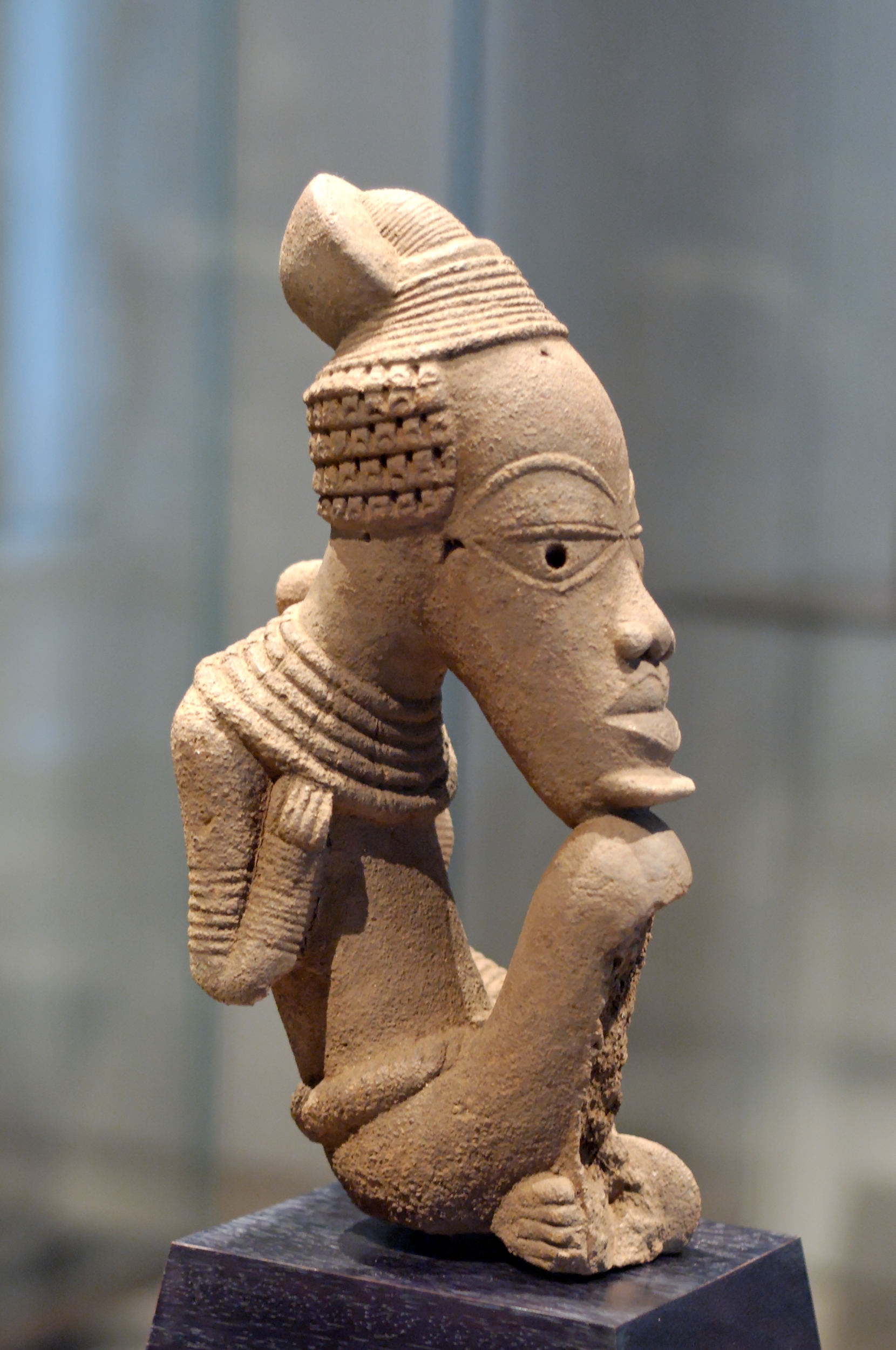
Nok sculpture, terracotta, Louvre

Dhar Tichitt and Oualata in present-day Mauritania figure prominently among the early urban centers, dated to 2,000 BC. About 500 stone settlements litter the region in the former savannah of the Sahara. Its inhabitants fished and grew millet. It has been found Augustin Holl that the Soninke of the Mandé peoples were likely responsible for constructing such settlements. Around 300 BC the region became more desiccated and the settlements began to decline, most likely relocating to Koumbi Saleh. Architectural evidence and the comparison of pottery styles suggest that Dhar Tichitt was related to the subsequent Ghana Empire. Djenné-Djenno (in present-day Mali) was settled around 300 BC, and the town grew to house a sizable Iron Age population, as evidenced by crowded cemeteries. Living structures were made of sun-dried mud. By 250 BC Djenné-Djenno had become a large, thriving market town. Towns similar to that at Djenne-Jeno also developed at the site of Dia, also in Mali along the Niger River, from around 900 BC.

Farther south, in central Nigeria, around 1,500 BC, the Nok culture developed in Jos Plateau. It was a highly centralized community. The Nok people produced lifelike representations in terracotta, including human heads and human figures, elephants, and other animals. By 500 BC they were smelting iron. By 200 AD the Nok culture had vanished. Based on stylistic similarities with the Nok terracottas, the bronze figurines of the Yoruba kingdom of Ife and those of the Bini kingdom of Benin are now believed to be continuations of the traditions of the earlier Nok culture.

Towards the end of the 3rd century CE, a wet period in the Sahel opened areas for human habitation and exploitation which had not been habitable for the better part of a millennium. Based on large tumuli scattered across West Africa dating to this period, it has been proposed that there were several contemporaneous kingdoms which have unfortunately been lost to history. Some important polities likely founded in the early-to-middle 1st millennium who did make it into the historical record include Mema, Takrur, Silla, and Wagadu (commonly called the Ghana Empire). Soninke traditions mention four previous foundings of Wagadu, and hold that the final founding of Wagadu occurred after their first king did a deal with Bida, a serpent deity who was guarding a well, to sacrifice one maiden a year in exchange for assurance regarding plenty of rainfall and gold supply. Soninke tradition portrays early Ghana as warlike, with horse-mounted warriors key to increasing its territory and population, although details of their expansion are extremely scarce.

=== Bantu expansion ===
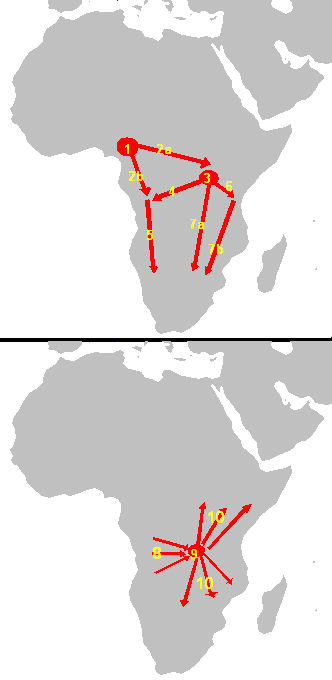
1=3000 – 1500 BC origin 2=c. 1500 BC first migrations 2.a=Eastern Bantu, 2.b=Western Bantu 3=1000 – 500 BC Urewe nucleus of Eastern Bantu 4 – 7=southward advance 9=500 BC – 0 Congo nucleus 10=0 – 1000 CE last phase

In the 4th millennium BCE the Congo Basin was inhabited by the Bambenga, Bayaka, Bakoya, and Babongo in the west, the Bambuti in the east, and the Batwa who were widely scattered and also present in the Great Lakes region; together they are grouped as Pygmies. On the later-named Swahili coast there were Cushitic-speaking peoples, and the Khoisan (a neologism for the Khoekhoe and San) in the continent's south. Early San society left a rich legacy of cave paintings across Southern Africa.

The Bantu expansion constituted a major series of migrations of Bantu-speaking peoples from Central Africa to Eastern and Southern Africa and was substantial in the settling of the continent. Commencing in the 2nd millennium BCE, the Bantu began to migrate from Cameroon to the Congo Basin, and eastward to the Great Lakes region to form the Urewe culture from the 5th century BC. In the 7th century AD, Bantu spread to the Upemba Depression, forming the Upemba culture.

During the 1st millennium BCE the Bantu spread further from the Great Lakes to Southern and East Africa. One early movement headed south to the upper Zambezi basin in the 2nd century BCE. The Bantu then split westward to the savannahs of present-day Angola and eastward into Malawi, Zambia, and Zimbabwe in the 1st century CE, forming the Gokomere culture in the 5th century CE. The second thrust from the Great Lakes was eastward, also in the 1st century AD, expanding to Kenya, Tanzania, and the Swahili coast.

Prior to this migration, the northern part of the Swahili coast was home to the elusive Azania, most likely a Southern Cushitic polity, extending southwards to modern-day Tanzania. The Bantu populations crowded out Azania, with Rhapta being its last stronghold by the 1st century CE, and traded via the Indian Ocean trade Madagascar was possibly first settled by Austronesians from 350 BC-550 CE, termed the Vazimba in Malagasy oral traditions, although there is considerable academic debate.

The eastern Bantu group would eventually meet with the southern migrants from the Great Lakes in Malawi, Zambia, and Zimbabwe and both groups continued southward, with eastern groups continuing to Mozambique and reaching Maputo in the 2nd century CE. Further to the south, settlements of Bantu peoples who were iron-using agriculturists and herdsmen were well established south of the Limpopo River by the 4th century CE, displacing and assimilating the Khoisan.

By the Chari River south of Lake Chad the Sao civilisation flourished for over a millennium beginning in the 6th century BCE, in territory that later became part of present-day Cameroon and Chad. Sao artifacts show that they were skilled workers in bronze, copper, and iron, with finds including bronze sculptures, terracotta statues of human and animal figures, coins, funerary urns, household utensils, jewellery, highly decorated pottery, and spears. Nearby, around Lake Ejagham in south-west Cameroon, the Ekoi civilisation rose circa 2nd century CE, and are most notable for constructing the Ikom monoliths and developing the Nsibidi script.

== See also ==
- Cradle of humanity
- Cradle of civilization
- List of kingdoms in Africa throughout history
