= Villa of Herodes Atticus =

Ancient Roman villa in Arcadia, Greece

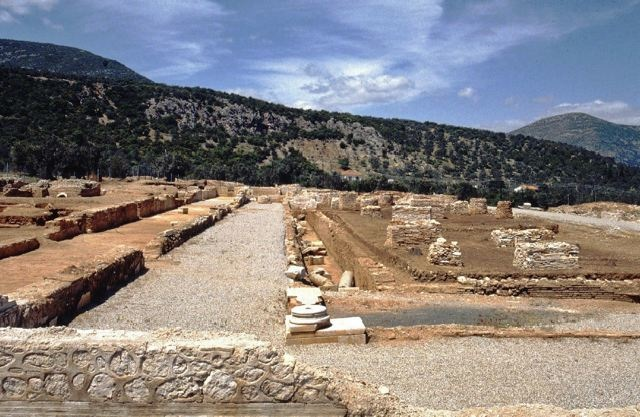

- Location within Greece
- 37.415959°N 22.685469°E
- Type: Villa
- Associated with: Herodes Atticus
- Location: Kato Doliana, North Kynouria, Arcadia, Greece
- Region: Peloponnese

History
- Built: 2nd century AD

Site notes
- Excavation dates: 1978
- Archaeologists: Georgios Steinhauer, Panagiotis Faklaris

Villa of Herodes Atticus is a large elaborate Roman villa located on the outskirts of Doliana and near Astros in Arcadia, Greece.

The villa resembles a palace for its size and decoration and was developed between the 1st and 4th centuries by the family of Herodes Atticus, a Greek rhetorician famous for his fortune and his actions of public patronage. It is one of the main vestiges of Roman villa architecture in Greece.

== History ==
The site, near the Argolic Gulf and bordering the Tános River, belonged in ancient Greece to Thyrea. It was near the ancient city of Eva, Arcadia.

=== The family villa of Herodes Atticus ===
The first villa was erected in the 1st century probably by his father Tiberius Claudius Atticus Herodes, ex-praetor, provincial priest, then consul suffect in 133 AD. However, it is likely that the land was purchased by Herodes Atticus' grandfather, Tiberius Claudius Hipparchus, one of the Empire's richest men who was accused of tyranny by Domitian and fled to Sparta and was probably executed.

Herodes Atticus carried out major extension work on the estate, giving it the grandeur and luxury of a rich patrician residence. The archaeological remains offer proof of a second phase, around the year 165, when overwhelmed by the loss of his wife Appia Annia Regilla and his sons, he covered the villa with artistic works of his relatives. In particular, he had the heroon of Antinous converted into a sort of funerary triclinium, placing several cenotaphs in the room as well as in the nymphaeum. Several stelae and a herm also testify to a heroic cult towards his adopted sons.

The villa suffered from attacks by the Heruli and from earthquakes in the late 3rd c. but was restored and continued in use until the end of the 4th c. and even until the following century.

=== Destruction and reuse ===
The property was partly destroyed at the end of the 4th century, possibly by an earthquake or the Visigoth invasions. At the beginning of the 5th century the baths and other parts of the villa were used for workshops and the north wing modified to create a large Christian basilica. The buildings collapsed a few centuries later, probably following a major earthquake in 856.

The Monastery of the Transfiguration, dating from the 12th century and located 250 m south of the villa, now houses many ancient artifacts most likely from the domain of Herodes Atticus. Remains of the Roman villa were integrated into the masonry. Traces of activity during the Byzantine, Ottoman and modern periods have been brought to light during excavations.

=== Rediscovery and modern excavations ===
The site was rediscovered in 1809 by British traveler William Martin Leake. He thought he saw, in the remains of a wall, the Hellenistic enclosure of ancient Thyrea. About forty years later, the German archaeologist Ernst Curtius refuted the idea of an urban wall in favour of Roman domestic use, without making any connection with Herodes Atticus. It was not until 1906 and the work of Konstantínos Rhomaíos that the villa became associated with the famous sophist.

Following the declaration of the area as an archaeological site in 1962, archaeological excavations were conducted in 1978 by Georg Steinhauer and Panayótis Fáklaris. Other campaigns took place between 1984, 1987 and in 1989. In the 1990s, salvage excavations continued under the direction of Theódoros Spyrópoulos and later his son Geórgios. Work to protect the site has been carried out since the end of the 2000s.

== Description ==
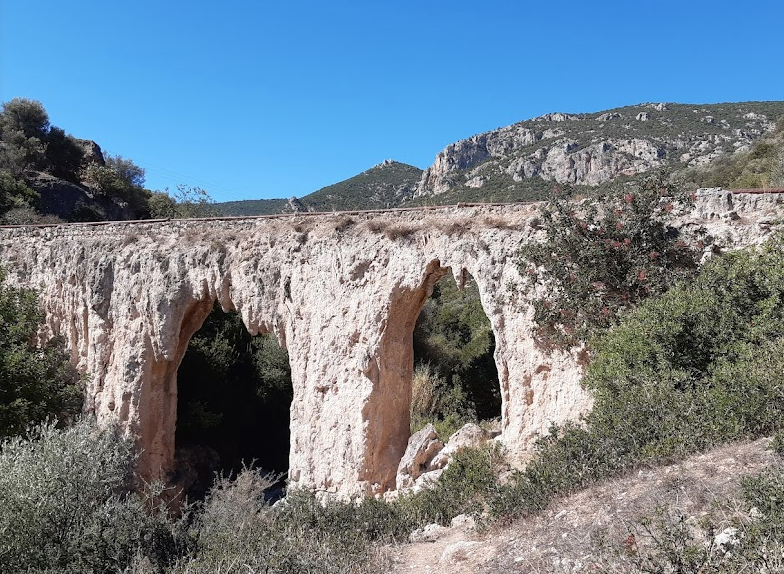
The Roman aqueduct near Herodes Atticus' villa

The villa of Herodes Atticus belongs to the model of the villa rustica intended as a holiday resort of wealthy landowners but also for agricultural production. The excavations have so far revealed about 6,500 m^{2} of an estimated total villa complex of 20,000 m^{2}. The villa was built on three monumental terraces rising from north to south, the central level of which was mainly occupied by a large peristyle garden that served as the spine of the whole residential complex.

The peristyle enclosed an island garden of 60 × 15 m surrounded by a water channel and with a 3 m wide pool at the west end. The water garden included a series of water displays and was fed by an imposing nymphaeum to the west, an architecture reminiscent of the Maritime Theatre of Hadrian's Villa at Tivoli. The peristyle of almost fifty columns was richly decorated with 1,300 m^{2} of polychrome mosaic floors. These included figures of the Muses, the labours of Hercules as well as representations of Ktisis (foundation) and Apolausis (enjoyment). The peristyle was also adorned with many fine statues.

To the west of the garden, behind the nymphaeum, a corridor led to a small civil basilica or aula of 19 × 11 m whose western end formed an apse. This was a formal reception and dining area, or triclinium, overlooking the nymphaeum, pool and peristyle. The most impressive of the statues were two monumental Hellenistic groups at the west end of the garden, each over 2.45 m tall, marble copies of famous bronze groups but probably made specifically for the villa. These were the Pasquino Group of Menelaus holding the body of Patroclus and the Achilles and Penthesilea sculpture, now in the Archaeological Museum of Astros.

The east end of the peristyle garden was adorned with six niches containing caryatids, similar to those at Herodes’ Via Appia estate, and then opened onto rooms including two nymphaea and a propylaea leading to a stadium-like garden.

The highest terrace to the south was supported by a 100 m-long cryptoporticus and included, from west to east, an octagonal tower, baths, a serapeum and a basilica (or aula) forming a heroon to Antinous.

On the lowest terrace was a large hypostyle hall of 940 m^{2}, with three naves supported by two rows of four Cipollino marble columns. Originally built by his father or grandfather, under Herodes an apse, adorned with statues including a colossal statue of Athena and portraits of Herodes and his family, was added to the west side and a palaestra or gymnasium to the east. A library probably occupied one of the adjoining rooms. In the 4th century the hall was transformed into a Christian basilica.

An aqueduct, whose remains encrusted with stalactites are still visible, supplied water to the villa from the source of Mána located about 1.5 km to the northwest.

=== Decorations ===
On the site a considerable number of statues, busts and reliefs have been unearthed, most of them in Dolianá marble, including classical masterpieces and Roman copies, representations of deities, portraits of the Antonine imperial family and the adopted sons of Herodes Atticus: Achilles, Polydeukes and Memnon.

Evaluation of the significance of the original sculptures and their position is continuing. A Pentelic marble head of Memnon is in the collections of the Altes Museum in Berlin. A relief evoking the Eleusinian Mysteries, a large statue of Antinous, an acephalous statue of Regilla and a stele with the list of soldiers who fell at the Battle of Marathon were also unearthed. These finds are kept in the Archaeological Museum of Astros, the Archaeological Museum of Tripoli and the National Archaeological Museum of Athens.

Most of the mosaics that have come down to us date from the 5th century and mainly depict mythological subjects. Among the figures and scenes depicted are the Muses Euterpe and Calliope, Dido, Aeneas, the nymph Arethusa, the river-gods Ladas, Alpheus and Acheloos, the Labours of Heracles and Achilles slaying Penthesilea.

== Finds from the villa of Herodes Atticus ==
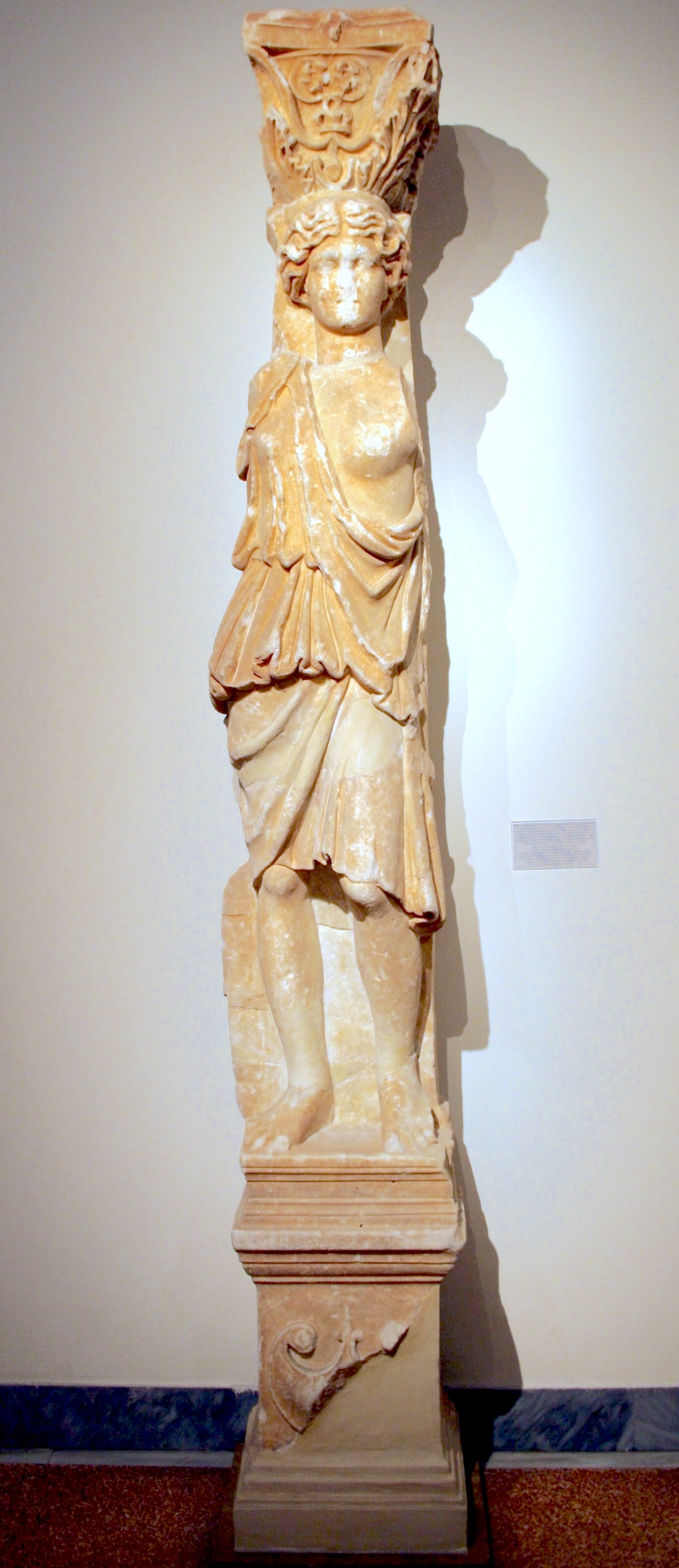
Caryatid from the peristyle garden

Relief depicting the heroisation of Polydeukion, favourite pupil and beloved of Herodes Atticus. Pentelic marble, 2nd c.

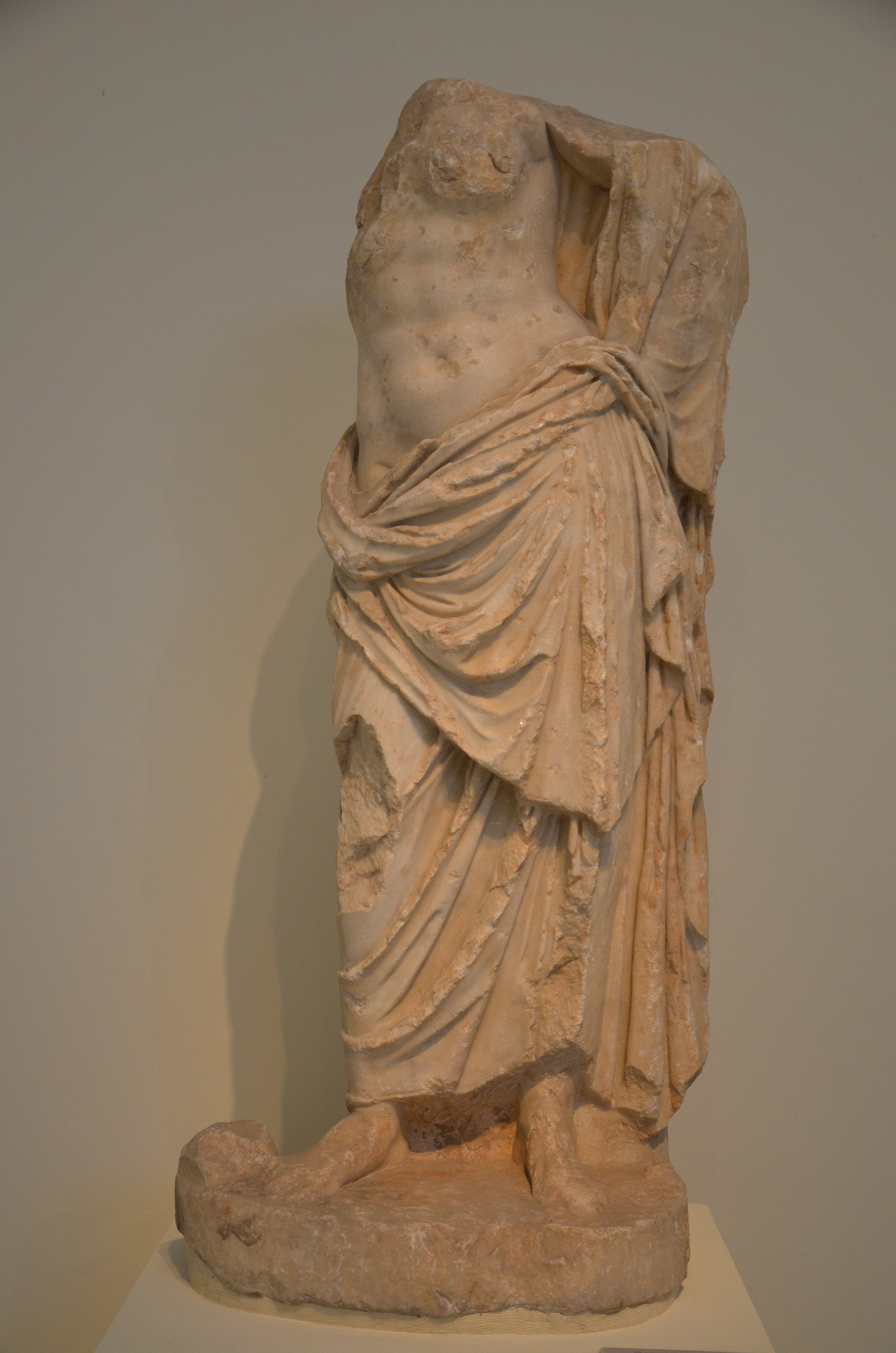
Statue of a goddess, possibly Aphrodite, middle of 2nd century.

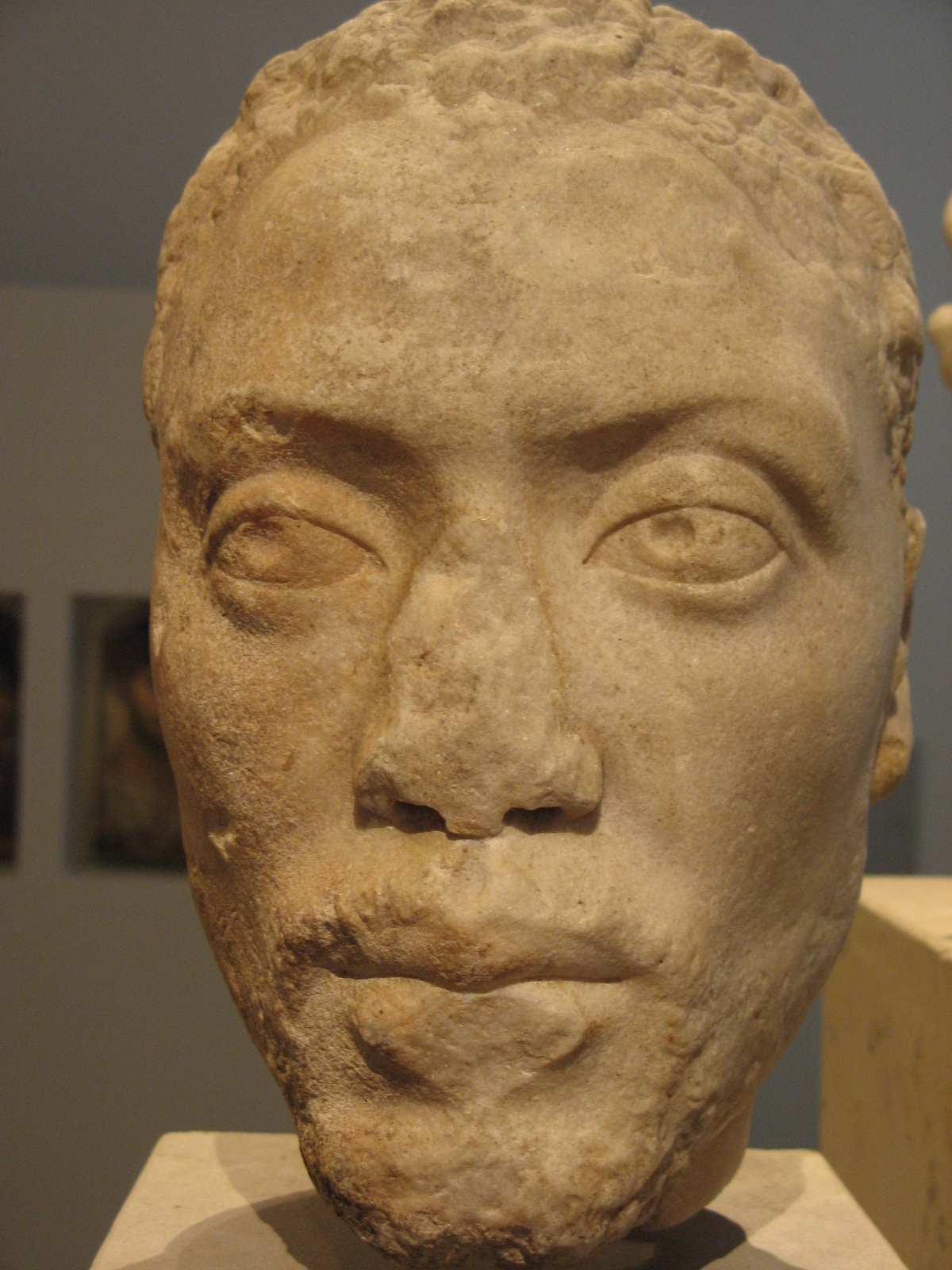
Roman bust of Memnon, foster child of Herodes Atticus.

== See also ==
- Archaeological Museum of Astros
- Loukou Monastery
- Odeon of Herodes Atticus
