= Thyrea (Greece) =

Town of Cynuria

Coordinates: 37°23′42″N 22°43′59″E

Thyrea (Ancient Greek: Θυρέα), also Thyraea, Thyreae or Thyreai (Θυρέαι), was a town of Cynuria, and was fought over between ancient Argolis and ancient Laconia. Its territory was called the Thyreatis (Θυρεᾶτις). According to Pausanias, Thyrea was named after a mythological figure: Thyraeos, the son of Lycaon.

== History ==
Thyrea enters history as the location of the Battle of the Champions (c. 546 BCE) between Argos and Sparta. According to Herodotus, Sparta had surrounded and captured the plain of Thyrea. When the Argives marched out to defend it, the two armies agreed to let 300 champions from each city fight, with the winner taking the territory. In 464 BCE when we hear of the Thyreans assisting the Spartans put down the helot uprising.

When the Aeginetans were expelled from their own island by the Athenians, at the commencement of the Peloponnesian War (431 BCE), the Spartans allowed them to settle in the Thyreatis, which at that time contained two towns, Thyrea and Anthene or Athene, both of which were made over to the fugitives. Here they maintained themselves till the 8th year of the Peloponnesian War, when the Athenians made a descent upon the coast of the Thyreatis, where they found the Aeginetans engaged in building a fortress upon the sea. This was forthwith abandoned by the latter, who took refuge in the upper city (ἡ ἄνω πόλις) at the distance of 10 stadia from the sea; but the Athenians followed them, took Thyrea, which they destroyed, and dragged away the inhabitants into slavery. Philip II of Macedon, the father of Alexander the Great, gave back the Thyreatis to the Argives. Philip V extended their territory along the coast as far as Glympeis and Zarax. It continued to belong to the Argives in the time of Pausanias; but even then the ancient boundary quarrels between the Argives and Spartans still continued.

== Territory ==
The Thyreatis, or territory of Thyrea, was a district of Cynuria, and was one of the most fertile plains in the Peloponnesus. It extends about 6 miles (10 km) in length along the coast, south of the pass Anigraea and the mountain Zavitsa. Its breadth is narrow, as the projecting spurs of Mount Parnon are never more than 3 miles (5 km), and sometimes only about a mile (1.6 km) from the coast. It is watered by two streams; one on its northern, and the other on its southern extremity. The former called Tanus (Τάνος) or Tanaus (Τάναος) formed the boundary between the Argeia and Laconia in the time of Euripides, who accordingly represents it as the boundary between the two states in the heroic age. The stream, which waters the southern extremity of the plain, is smaller than the Tanus; it also rises in Mt. Parnon, and appears in ancient times to have borne the name of Charadrus, which is described by Statius, as flowing in a long valley near Neris. The bay between the two rivers was called the Thyreatic Gulf (ὁ Θυρεάτης κόλπος).

== Current situation ==
Its site is tentatively located near the modern Kastraki Meligou, in Arcadia prefecture, North Kynouria municipality, northwest of Astros.

== See also ==
- Archaeological Museum of Astros
- Anthene

== Bibliography ==
- N. Robertson, Festivals and legends: The Formation of Greek Cities in the Light of Public Ritual (University of Toronto press, 1992), pp. 179–207.
- J.E. Lendon, "Soldiers & Ghosts: A history of Battle in classical antiquity" (Yale University press, 2006).
