= Neris (Cynuria) =

Coordinates: 37°25′58″N 22°40′29″E

Neris (Ancient Greek: Νηρίς or Νῆρις) was a village of Cynuria, located between Eva and Anthene. Above these villages was the range of Mount Parnon, where, not far from the sources of the Tanus or Tanaus, the boundaries of the Lacedaemonians, Argives, and Tegeatae joined, and were marked by stone hermae. Neris is also mentioned by Statius, who describes it as situated in a long valley of the river Charadrus.

Its site is tentatively located near the modern Kato Doliana.
