= Kato Doliana =

Greek village

Kato Doliana Κάτω Δολιανά
- Community
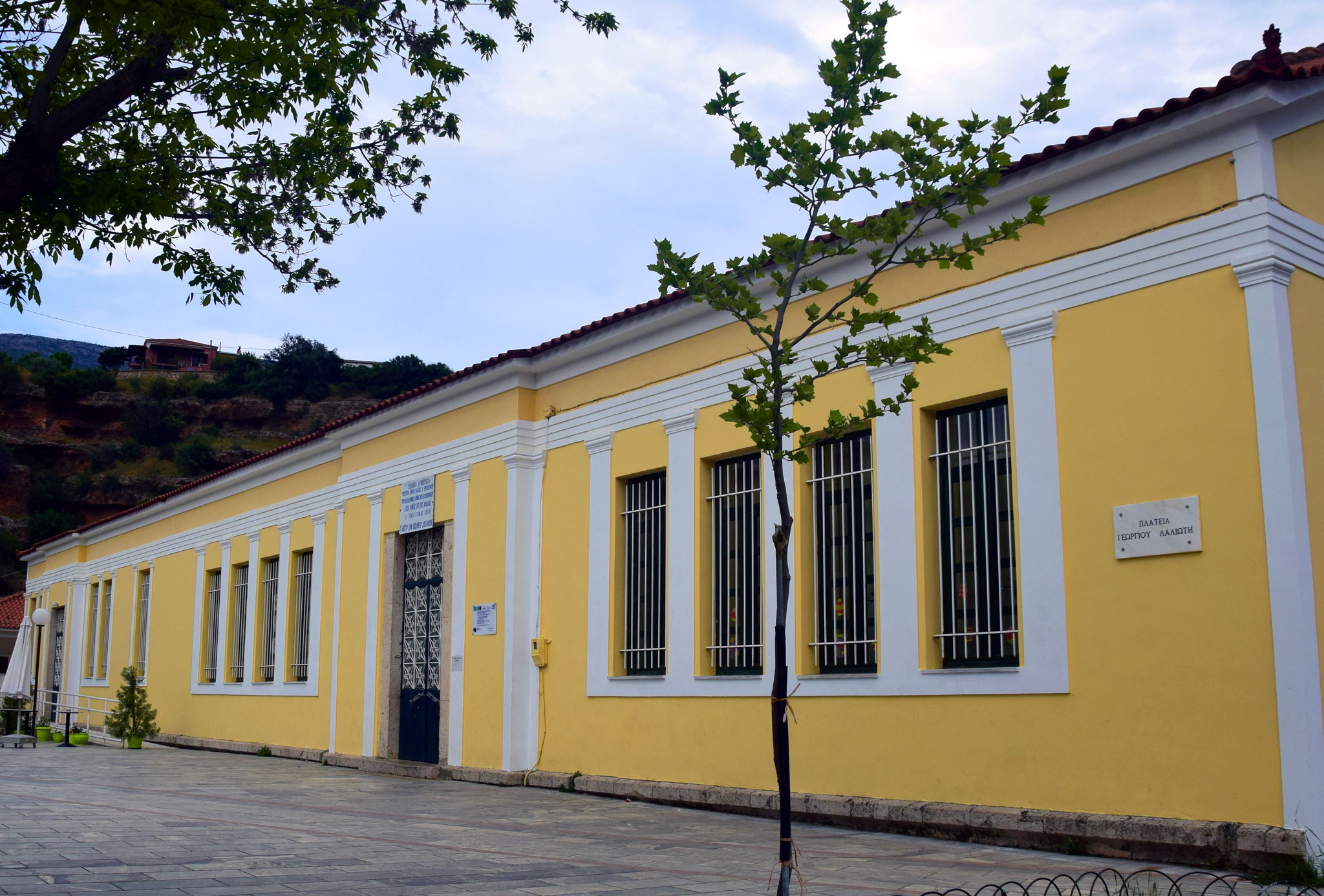
- The primary school, located on the village square.

- Location within Greece
- Coordinates: 37°25′51″N 22°40′48″E
- Country: Greece
- Administrative region: Peloponnese
- Regional unit: Arcadia
- Municipality: North Kynouria
- Elevation: 90 m (300 ft)

Population (2021)
  - Community: 723
- Time zone: UTC+2 (EET)
  - Summer (DST): UTC+3 (EEST)
- Postal code: 220 01
- Area code: 27550

Kato Doliana (Greek: Κάτω Δολιανά) is a village in North Kynouria, in eastern Arcadia, Greece. It is part of a municipality that consists of the villages Kato Doliana, Ano Doliana, Dragouni, Kouvlis, Prosilia and Rouneika. The population of the community is 723 (2021 census). The largest village of the community is Kato Doliana. It serves as the winter residence of the population of Ano Doliana. It is considered a traditional settlement.

Olive oil production is the main source of income for the inhabitants.

== Geography ==
The village is situated on the left bank of the river Tanos, on the south slopes of mountain Zavitsa. It is surrounded by an extensive olive trees plantation. The natural caves that have formed due to the erosion of the terrain caused by the flow of the river are of particular interest. They divide the settlement into two neighborhoods. The upper neighborhood is called Palamidi.

== Attractions ==
The ancient Villa of Herodes Atticus at Eva is the most notable landmark. One can also visit the ancient settlements of Kourmeki and Tsiorovos and the women's Byzantine Monastery of Loukou.

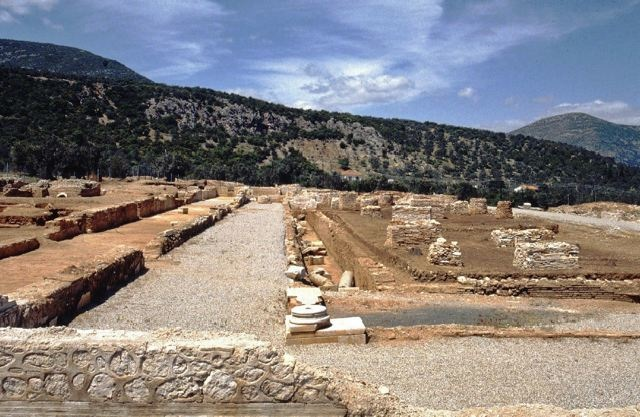
Herodes Atticus's villa is in the vicinity of the community

== Demographic evolution ==
Demographic evolution
Year	Settlement	Community
1834	-	893
1861	-	1,336
1870	-	1,323
1879	-	1,682
1889	-	1,577
1896	-	1,649
1907	-	1,627
1920	-	1,849
1928	-	1,796
1940	82	1,680
1951	1,246	1,650
1961	1,081	1,497
1971	1,099	1,404
1981	1,075	1,338
1991	933	1,283
2001	780	1,097
2011	595	846
2021	503	723

== People ==
- James Pantemis, Canadian professional goalkeeper of Greek descent, from his grandmother's side.

== See also ==
- Ano Doliana, the mountainous residency of the settlers
- List of settlements in Arcadia
- List of traditional settlements of Greece
