= EUA =

Eua or EUA may refer to:

== Places ==
- ʻEua, Tonga
- Eua (Cynuria), an ancient town of Cynuria, Greece
- Eva, Arcadia, Greece
- United States of America (French: États-Unis d'Amérique; Portuguese: Estados Unidos da América; Spanish: Estados Unidos de América; Tagalog: Estados Unidos ng Amerika)

== Other uses ==
- Emergency Use Authorization, a legal means for the U.S. Food and Drug Administration to approve new medical treatments during a declared emergency
- EU Allowance, climate credits used in the European Union Emissions Trading Scheme
- Eua (gastropod), a genus of snail
- ʻEua Airport, in Tonga
- Eua Sunthornsanan (1910–1981), Thai musician
- European Unit of Account, a predecessor of the euro
- European University Association
- United Team of Germany which competed in the 1956, 1960, and 1964 Olympic Games
