= Polemocrates =

Polemocrates or Polemokrates may refer to:

- Polemocrates of Elimeia, father of the Macedonian general Coenus
- Polemocrates (physician), son of Machaon
