= Eva (Cynuria) =

Greek archaeological location

Coordinates: 37°22′43″N 22°41′02″E

Eva or Eua (Ancient Greek: Εὔα) was an ancient village of Cynuria (part of Arcadia in the Peloponnese, Greece), located inland not far from Neris. Pausanias, who visited the region in the 2nd century, on leaving Thyrea, came first to Anthene, next to Neris, and lastly to Eva, which he describes as the largest of the three villages, containing a sanctuary of Polemocrates, son of Machaon, who was honoured here as a god or hero of the healing art. Above these villages was the range of Mount Parnon, where, not far from the sources of the Tanus or Tanaus, the boundaries of the Lacedaemonians, Argives, and Tegeatae joined, and were marked by stone Hermae. This Eva is probably also meant by Stephanus of Byzantium, though he calls it a city of Arcadia.

Its site is tentatively associated with an ancient fortification on Teichio ridge above the hamlet of Elliniko (Astros). Excavations in 1980 revealed the ruins of the villa of Herodes Atticus (2nd century AD) near the Byzantine Monastery of Loukou, 4 km north of Elliniko. Spectacular finds came to light, among them mosaics, inscriptions, statues and other works of art. Pausanias does not mention the villa, whether because he had not actually visited the area or because he tended to ignore private monuments erected by his contemporaries.
