= Panagiotis Faklaris =

Greek professor of archaeology (born 1947)

Panagiotis V. Faklaris (Greek: Παναγιώτης Β. Φάκλαρης) is a Greek archaeologist. He is a professor of classical archaeology at Aristotle University and excavator of the acropolis and the walls of Vergina. His academic focuses have included the topography of ancient Macedonia, topography of ancient Kynouria, arms and armour, horse harnesses, ancient Greek daily life, metal finds, Greek mythology

== Education and early life ==
Faklaris was born in Arcadia, Greece, April 1947. He studied archaeology at the Aristotle University of Thessaloniki and the University of Cambridge UK.

== Career ==
From 1978 to 1992, Faklaris was an assistant to Greek archaeology professor Manolis Andronikos. Since 1985, has been teaching most subjects of classical archaeology at the Department of Archaeology of the Aristotle University in Thessaloniki, Greece. He is also director of research programs at the Aristotle University.

He has written numerous scholarly papers in international archaeological journals and a number of books.

As late as 1994 he claimed (contrary to mainstream opinion) that the site of Aegae is actually that of ancient Balla, and that the real site of Aegea near the "Gardens of Midas" on the slopes of the Vermio Mountains near Naousa.

=== Professional affiliations and awards ===
He has been a member of the Athens Archaeological Society since 1986 and a member of the Greek Folklore Society since 1977. He is a founding member of the Association for the Study of Ancient Greek Technology (EMAET) and Arcadian Academy. He is also a member of the Historical and Epigraphical Studies Society and the Peloponnesian Studies Society.

In 1993 he received the award of the Academy of Athens for his book Αρχαία Κυνουρία. Ανθρώπινη δραστηριότητα και περιβάλλον. (Ancient Kynouria. Human Activity and Environment).
