= Xiropigado =

Xiropigado Ξηροπήγαδο
- Settlement
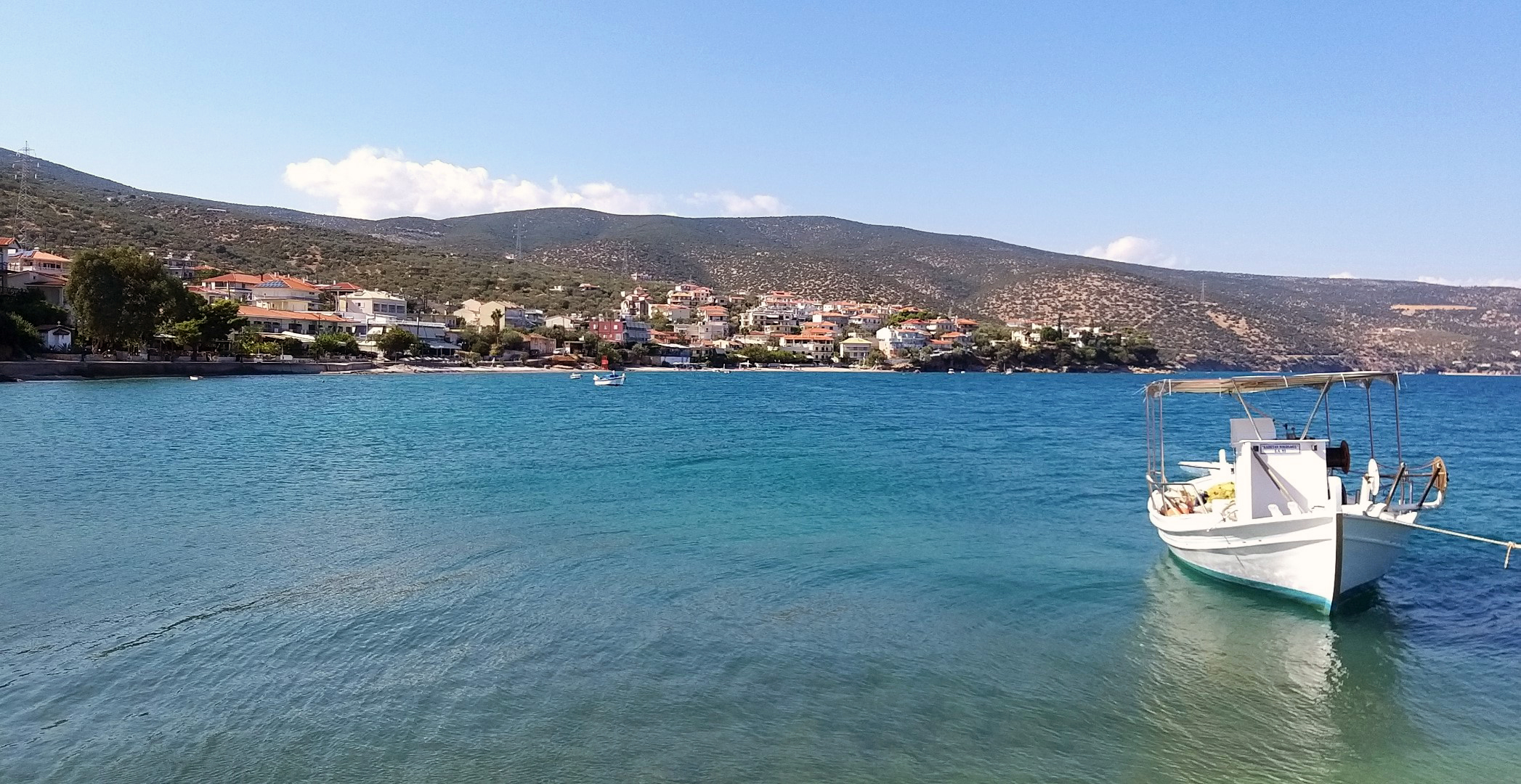
- View of the beach from the pier

- Location within Greece
- Country: Greece
- Administrative region: Peloponnese
- Regional unit: Arcadia
- Municipality: North Kynouria
- Elevation: 78 m (256 ft)

Population (2021)
  - Community: 363
- Time zone: UTC+2 (EET)
  - Summer (DST): UTC+3 (EEST)
- Postal code: 221 00
- Area code: 27550

Xiropigado (Greek: Ξηροπήγαδο) is a village in the municipality of North Kynouria, in eastern Arcadia, Greece. It has 363 inhabitants (2021) and is a small seaside resort, located on the eastern slopes of mountain Zavitsa, only 10 kilometres away from nearby Astros and 150 kilometres from Athens.

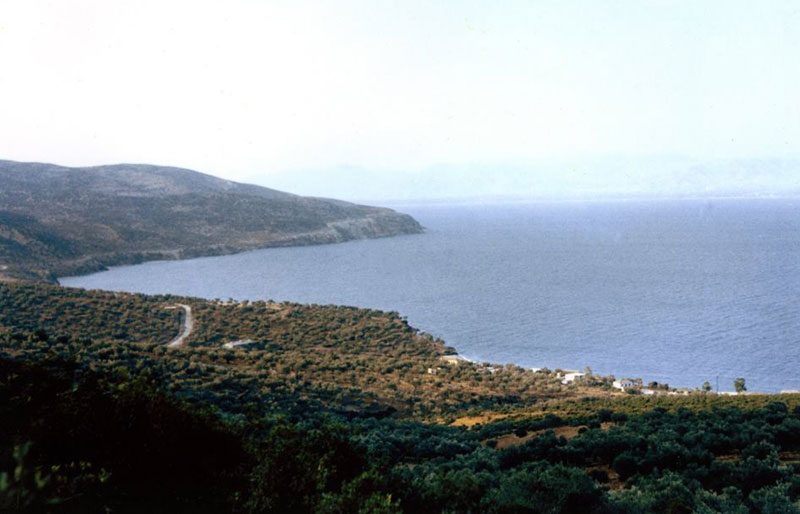
Xiropigado in 1965

== See also ==
- List of settlements in Arcadia
