= Polemocrates (physician) =

In Greek mythology, Polemocrates (Ancient Greek: Πολεμοκράτης) was a physician, and son of Machaon and grandson of Asclepius, god of health. He had a sanctuary, at the village of Eua in Argolis and was honoured there as a god or hero of the healing art.
