= Wagadu (mythology) =

Wagadu is an ancient Soninke goddess, whose disappearance and rediscovery are the subject of the ancient Dausi epic in a version of Mande mythology. She is related to Soninke legends and folklore set during the Soninke's heroic era, roughly the 6th to 1st centuries BC.

== See also ==
- Gassire's Lute
