= Glyppia =

Coordinates: 37°10′29″N 22°41′00″E

Glyppia or Glympia (Ancient Greek: Γλυππία) was a village of ancient Laconia in Mount Parnon, situated near the frontiers of Argolis and Cynuria. Glyppia is the name in Pausanias, who simply describes it as situated in the interior above Marius. It appears to be the same place as the fortress called Glympeis (Γλυμπεῖς) by Polybius, who places it near the borders of the Argolis and Laconia, and who relates that the Messenians were defeated here in 218 BCE by the Spartans, when they were endeavouring, by a round-about march from Tegea, to penetrate into the southern valley of the Eurotas. It is also mentioned on another occasion by Polybius (4.36).

Its site is located near the modern Agios Vasileios.
