= Loukou Monastery =

Monastery in Arcadia

Monastery of Loukou
- Ιερά Μονή Λουκούς
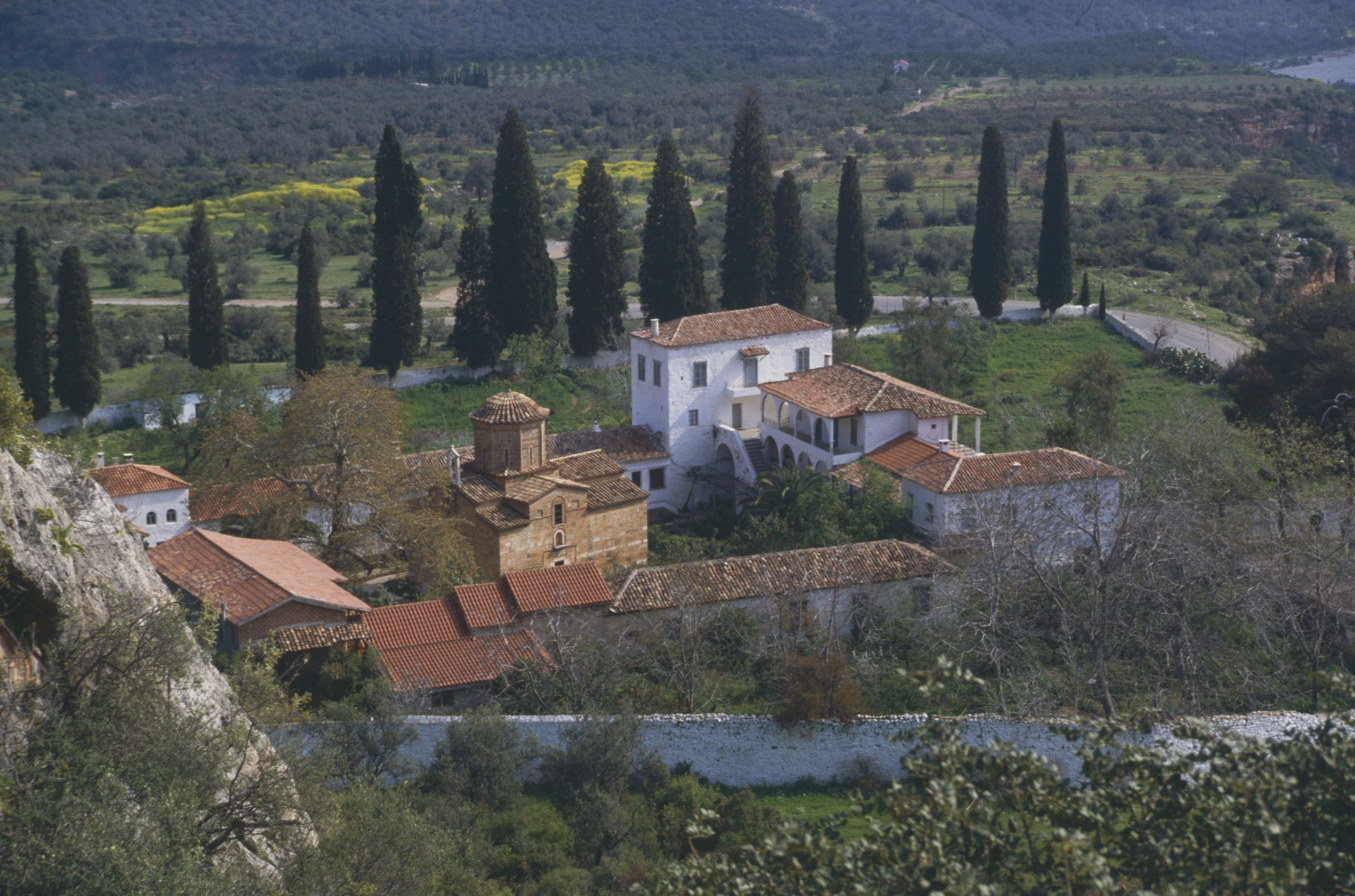

- Location within Greece
- Interactive map of Monastery of Loukou

Monastery information
- Order: Greek Orthodox
- Established: 1117
- Dedication: Transfiguration of Jesus
- Diocese: Holy Metropolis of Mantineia and Kynouria

Site
- Location: Kato Doliana, Arcadia, Greece
- Country: Greece
- Coordinates: 37.413785°N 22.683554°E
- Public access: yes
- Website: immk.gr

The Monastery of Loukou is an Orthodox Christian monastery located in eastern Arcadia, Greece.

== See also ==
- Villa of Herodes Atticus
