= Zavitsa =

Mountain in Greece

- Arcadia
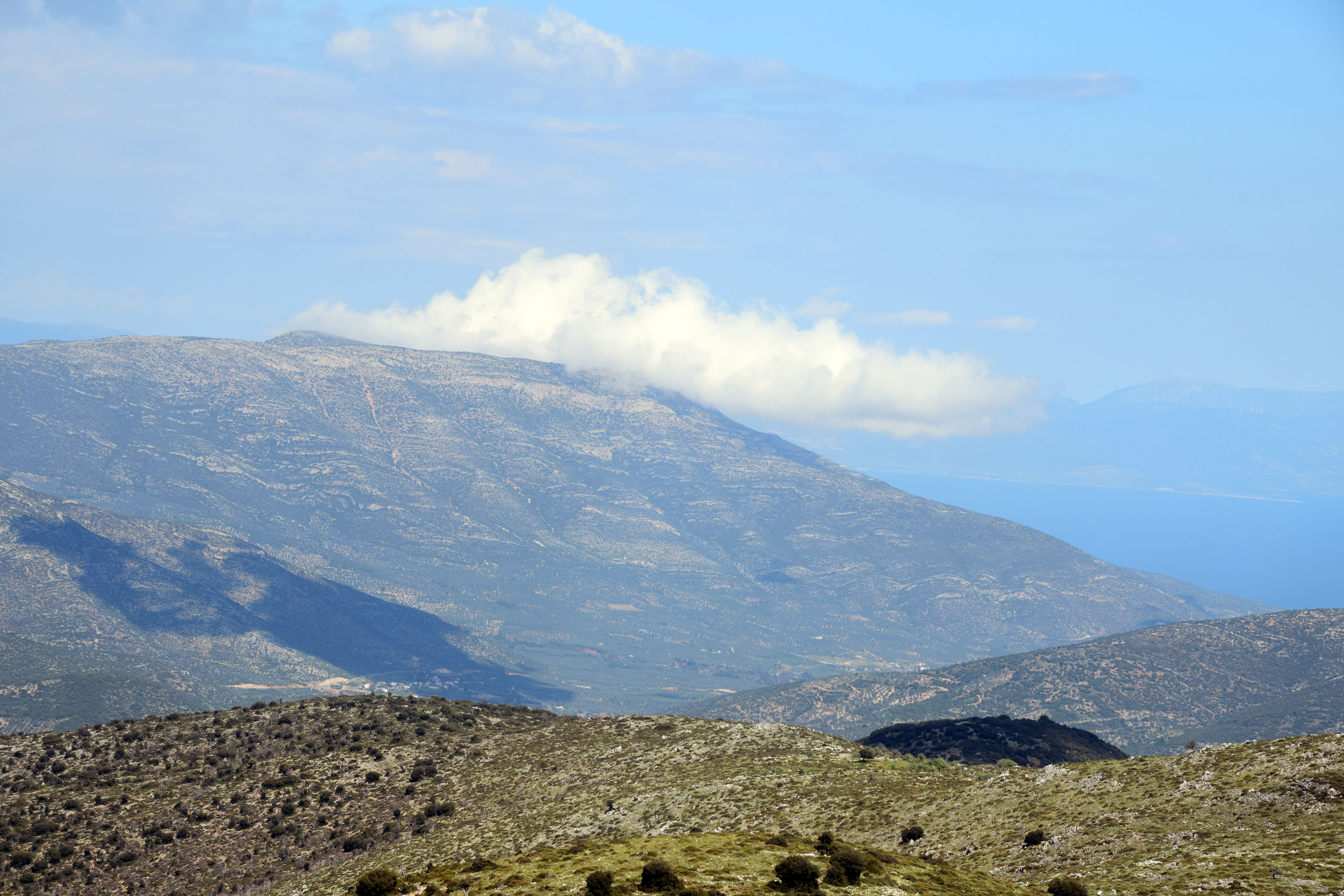
- SW side of Zavitsa

Highest point
- Peak: Profitis Ilias
- Elevation: 974 m (3,196 ft)

Geography
- Location within Greece
- Country: Greece
- Region: Peloponnese
- Regional units: Arcadia
- Range coordinates: 37°27′33″N 22°42′21″E

Zavitsa (Greek: Ζάβιτσα) is a mountain in the Peloponnese, known in antiquity as Timenion Oros, meaning Timenion mountain.

Its contemporary name comes from slavic language, either from the word "zaviča", which translates to "the village", or "zavičaj" which means "homeland". Russian-German linguist Max Vasmer writes that it comes from the word "Žabica", which means "a frog".

It lies on the northeastern edges of Arcadia, marking the natural boundaries with Argolis to the north. Its highest peak is Profitis Ilias rising at 974 meters above sea level. Its easternmost slopes reach the Arcadian coasts that form part of the wider Argolic Gulf area. Astros, Xiropigado, Kato Vervena, Kato Doliana and Prosilia are villages located around its slopes.

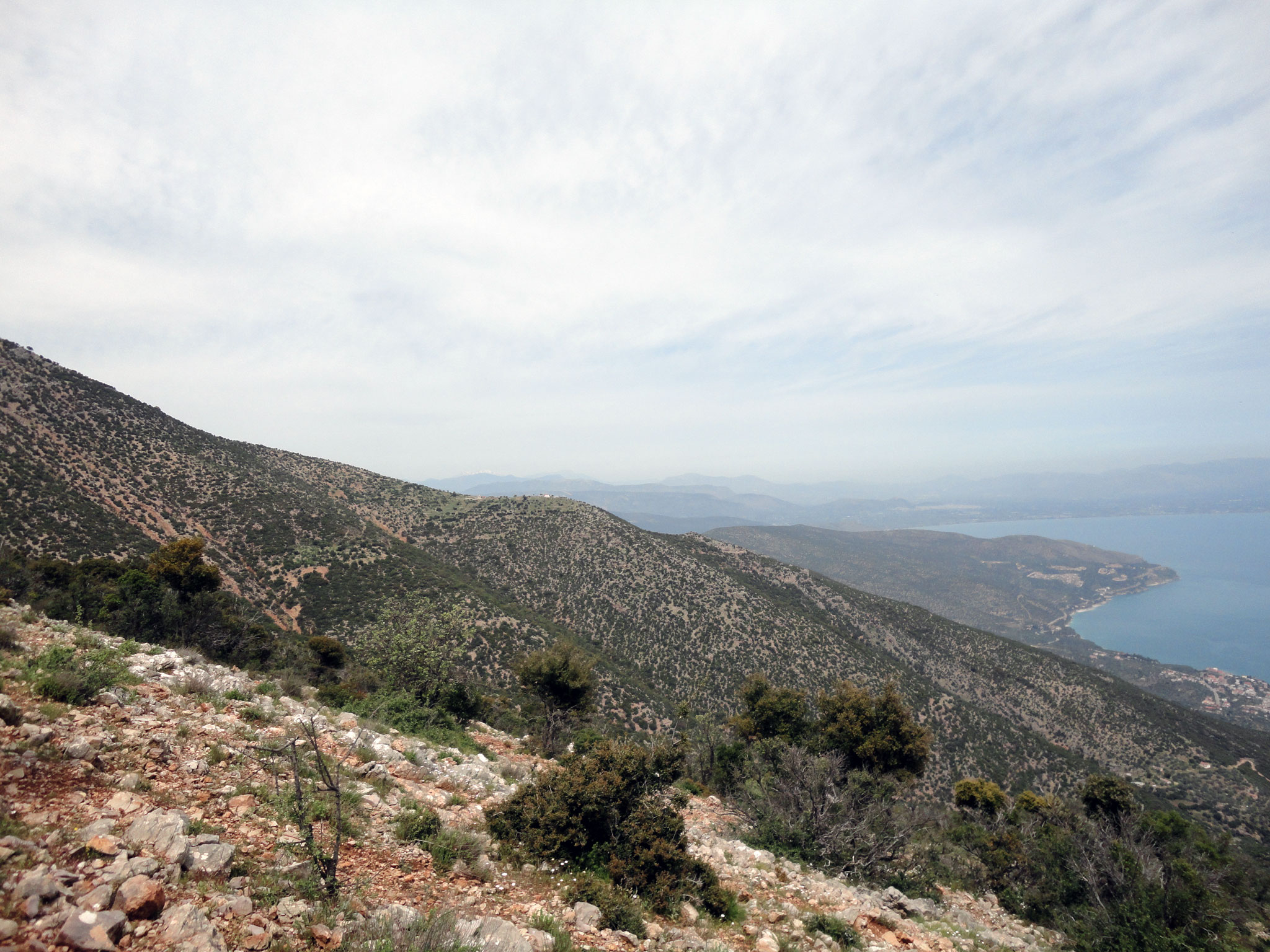
NE view, Argolic Gulf on the background

== See also ==
- List of mountains in Greece
