= Anthene (Cynuria) =

Coordinates: 37°22′03″N 22°47′06″E

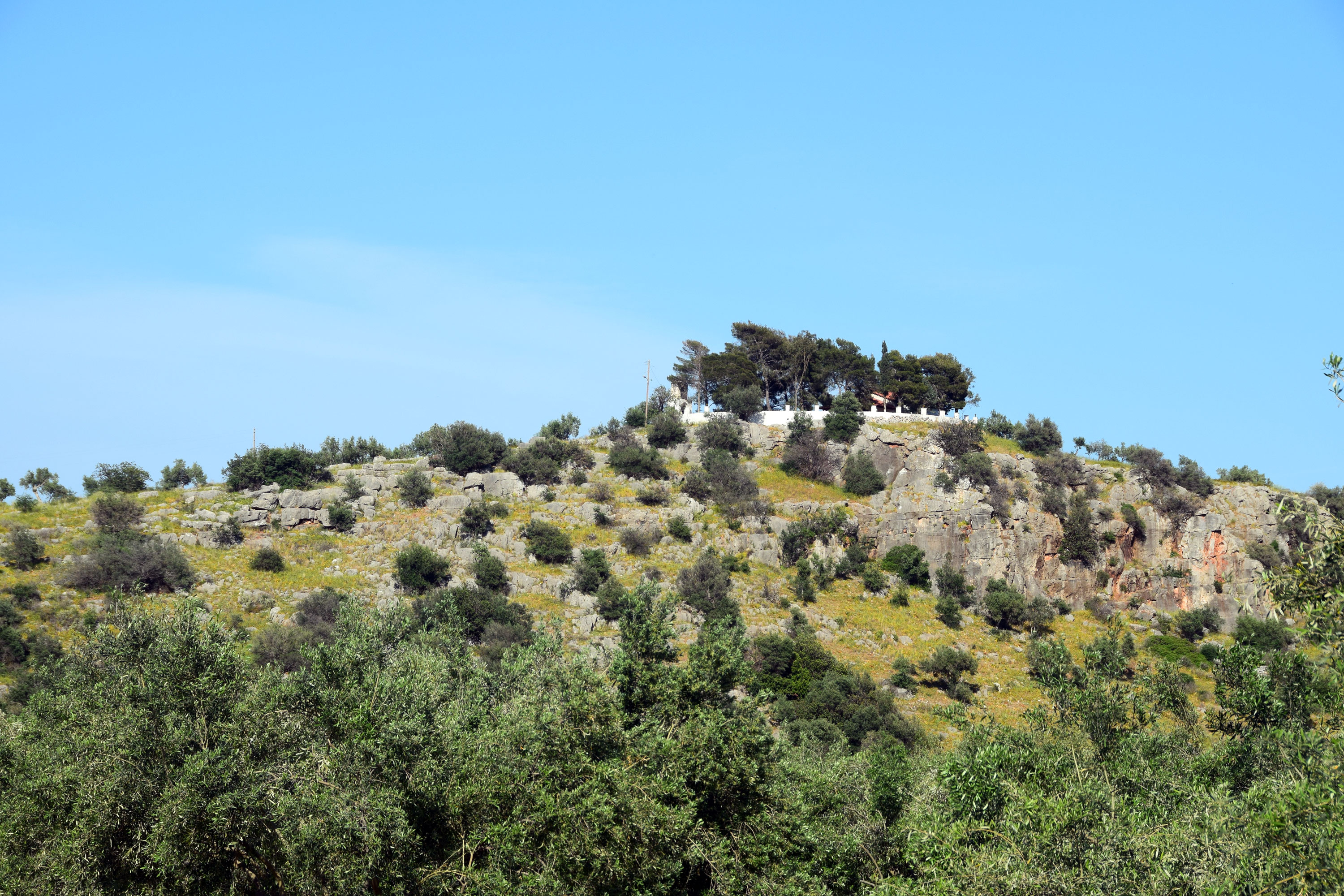
Hill containing the remnants of Anthene

Anthene (Ancient Greek: Ἀνθήνη), or Anthana (Ἀνθάνα), or Athene (Ἀθήνη), was a town in Cynuria, originally inhabited by the Aeginetans, and mentioned by Thucydides along with Thyrea, as the two chief places in Cynuria.

== See also ==
- Archaeological Museum of Astros
- Thyrea
