= Cynuria =

Historical region in Greece

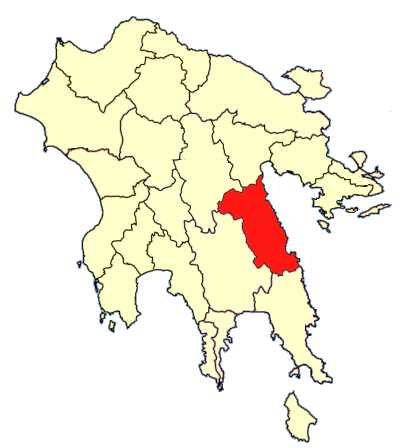
Kynouria province

Cynuria (ἡ Κυνουρία, Kynouria or ἡ Κυνουριακή, Kynouriake) is an ancient district on the eastern coast of the Peloponnese, between the Argolis and Laconia, so called from the Cynurians, one of the most ancient tribes in the peninsula. It was believed to have taken its name from the mythical Cynurus.

== Location and history ==
Herodotus regarded the Cynurians as autochthones, but at the same time called them Ionians. There can be little doubt, however, that they were Pelasgians; but in consequence of their maritime position, they were regarded as a different race from the Arcadian Pelasgians, and came to be looked upon as Ionians, which was the case with the Pelasgians dwelling upon the coast of the Gulf of Corinth, in the district afterwards called Achaia.

They were a semi-barbarous and predatory tribe, dwelling chiefly in the eastern slopes of Mount Parnon; but their exact boundaries cannot be defined, as they were only a tribe, and never formed a political body. At a later time they were almost confined to the Thyreatis, or district of Thyrea. Originally they extended much further south.

Upon the conquest of Peloponnesus by the Dorians, the Cynurians were subdued by the Argeians, whose territory at one time extended along the eastern coast of Peloponnesus down to Cape Malea. The Cynurians were now reduced to the condition of Argive Perioeci. They continued as subjects of Argos for some time; but as Sparta rose in power, she endeavoured to increase her territory at the expense of Argos; and Cynuria, but more especially the fertile district of the Thyreatis, was a frequent subject of contention between the two states, and was in possession sometimes of the one, and sometimes of the other power.

As early as the reign of Echestratus, the son of Agis, who is placed about 1000 BCE, the Spartans are said to have gained possession of Cynuria, but they were driven out of it subsequently, and it continued in the hands of the Argives till about 547 BCE, when the celebrated battle was fought between the 300 champions from either nation. But the great victory of Cleomenes over the Argives near Tiryns, shortly before the Persian wars, was the event which secured to the Spartans undisputed possession of Cynuria for a long time. When the Aeginetans were expelled from their own island by the Athenians, at the commencement of the Peloponnesian War (431 BCE), the Spartans allowed them to settle in the Thyreatis, which at that time contained two towns, Thyrea and Anthene or Athene, both of which were made over to the fugitives. Here they maintained themselves till the 8th year of the Peloponnesian war, when the Athenians made a descent upon the coast of the Thyreatis, where they found the Aeginetans engaged in building a fortress upon the sea. This was forthwith abandoned by the latter, who took refuge in the upper city (ἡ ἄνω πόλις) at the distance of 10 stadia from the sea; but the Athenians followed them, took Thyrea, which they destroyed, and dragged away the inhabitants into slavery.

Philip, the father of Alexander the Great, gave back the Thyreatis to the Argives, and extended their territory along the coast as far as Glympeis and Zarax. It continued to belong to the Argives in the time of Pausanias; but even then the ancient boundary quarrels between the Argives and Spartans still continued. Among the populated places noted by the ancient writers were: Thyrea, Anthene, Neris, and Eva.

== Province ==
The Province of Kynouria (Greek: Επαρχία Κυνουρίας) was one of the provinces of the Arcadia prefecture. The province, established in the 19th century, covered only the northern half of the ancient region of Cynuria. It was abolished in 2006, and following the 2011 Kallikratis reform, its territory is occupied by the municipalities of North Kynouria and South Kynouria. The region is also traditionally known as Tsakonia (Greek: Τσακωνία or Τσακωνιά) after the Tsakonians, who belong to a very ancient branch of the Greek language family.
