= Archaeological Museum of Astros =

Coordinates: 37°24′24″N 22°43′15″E

- Αρχαιολογικό Μουσείο Άστρους
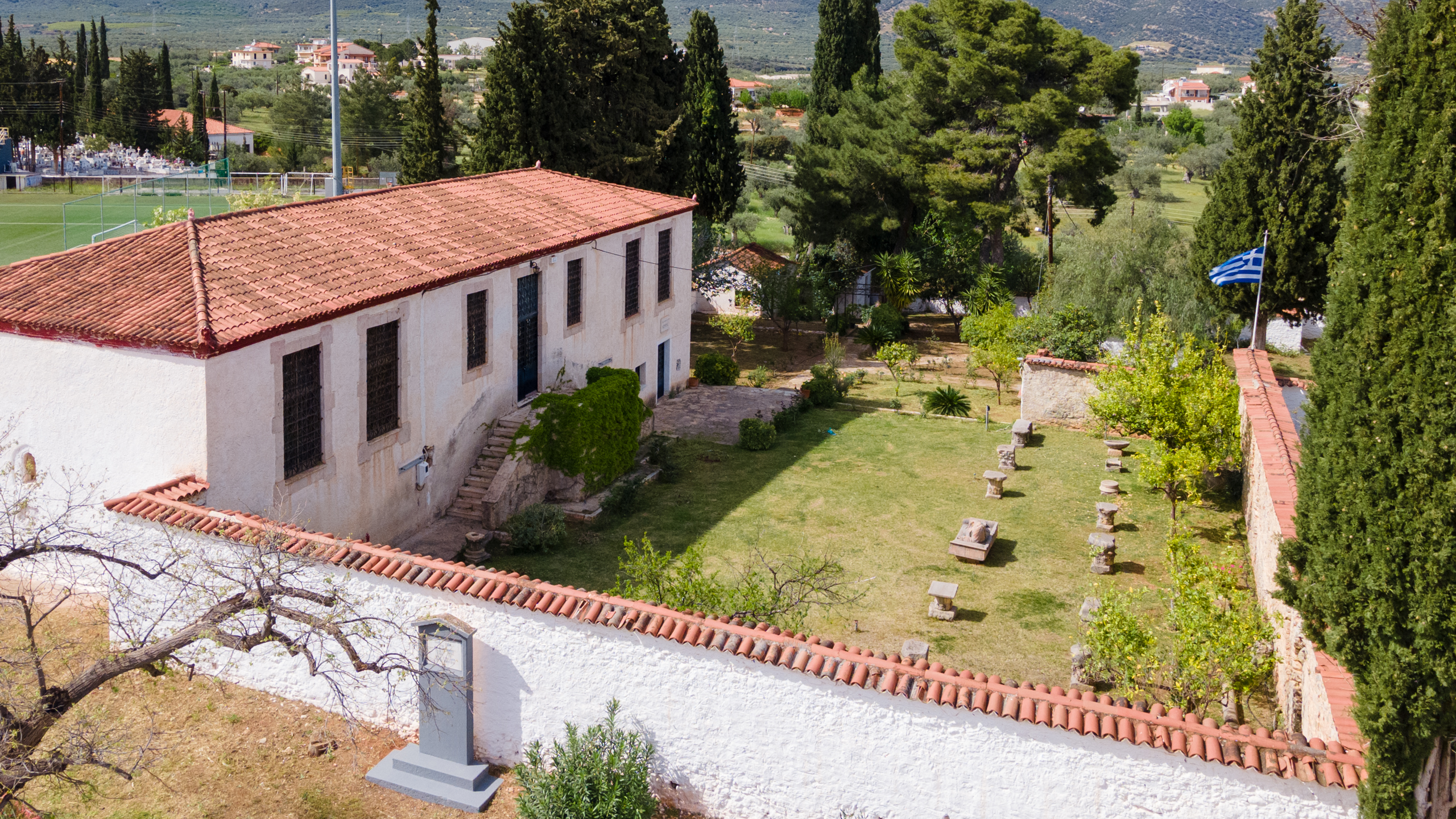
- Outside view
- Established: 1985
- Location: Astros, Greece
- Type: Archaeological museum
- Founders: Dr. Theodoros Spyropoulos, Ephorate of Antiquities of Arcadia

The Archaeological Museum of Astros is a museum in Αstros, Arcadia, Greece. It is located in a building which has been used as Karytsiotis school, since the second half of the twentieth century. In 1985, the building was converted into a museum by the Ephor of Antiquities, Dr. Theodoros Spyropoulos. The courtyard of the building was similarly adapted into an archaeological park.

== See also ==
- Anthene (Cynuria)
