= Tanos (river) =

River in Arcadia, Peloponnese, Greece

Coordinates: 37°26′04″N 22°45′28″E

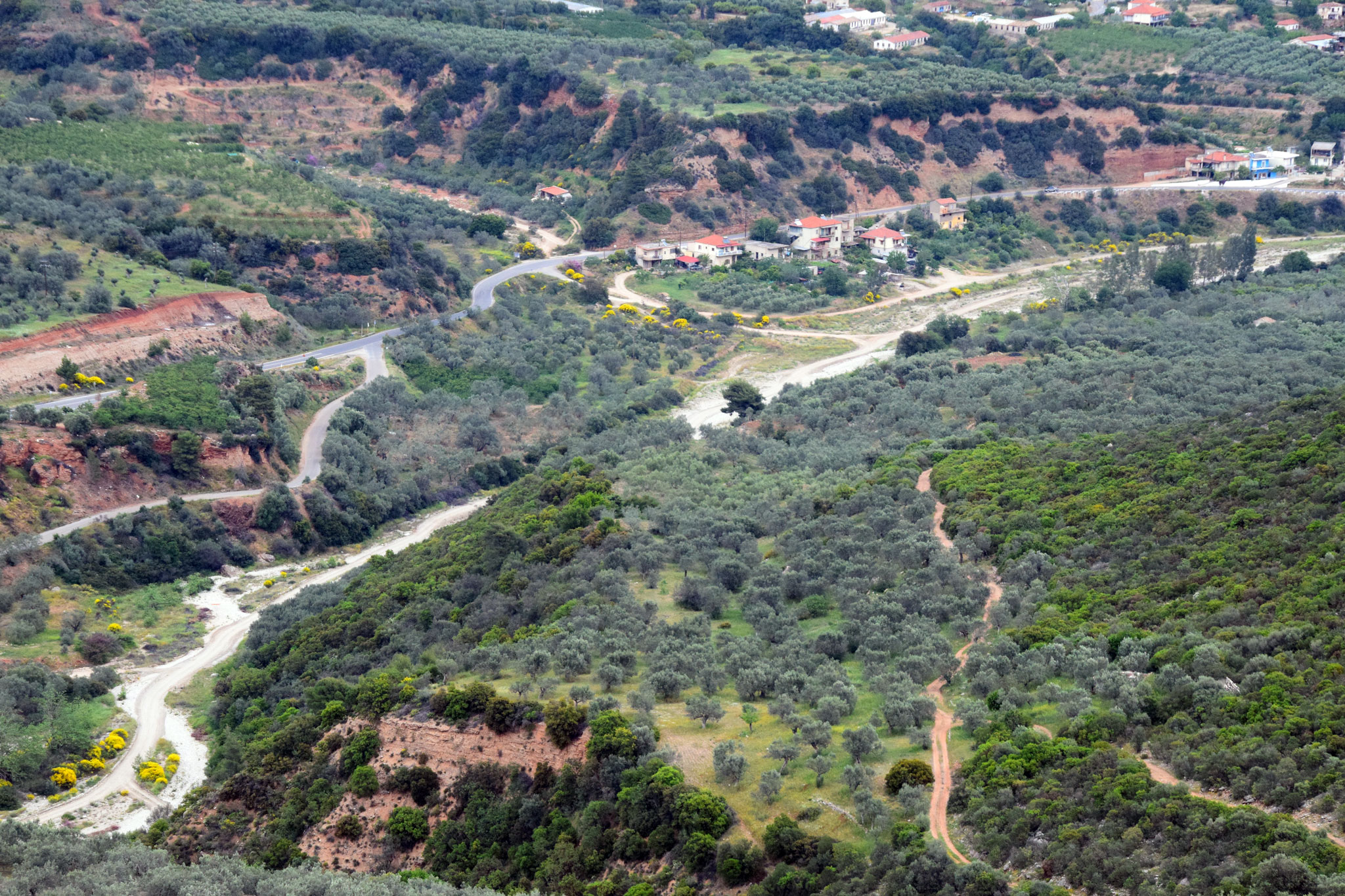
Tanos river

The Tanos or Tanus (Τάνος), also called the Tanaus or Tanaos (Τάναος) is a river of the Peloponnese, Greece. In antiquity it was the northern border of the Thyreatis, or territory of the city of Thyrea, in the ancient region of Cynuria. It waters one of the most fertile plains in the Peloponnesus. The river rises in the summits of Mount Parnon, and falls into the sea, at present north of Astros, but earlier south of the latter place. It formed the boundary between the Argeia and ancient Laconia in the time of Euripides, who accordingly represents it as the boundary between the two states in the heroic age.
