= Arcadia Lost =

- Directed by: Phedon Papamichael
- Written by: David Ariniello
- Produced by: Kelly Thomas
- Starring: Haley Bennett; Carter Jenkins; Nick Nolte
- Cinematography: Phedon Papamichael
- Edited by: Philip Harrison
- Music by: Michael Brook
- Production companies: Chambers Productions; Top Cut
- Release date: June 12, 2010 (Los Angeles Greek Film Festival)
- Country: United States
- Language: English

Arcadia Lost is a 2010 American drama film directed by Phedon Papamichael and starring Haley Bennett, Carter Jenkins, and Nick Nolte. The film both takes place and was filmed in Greece. Specifically it was filmed in the village Poulithra, in the municipal unit of Leonidio, in the municipality of South Kynouria, in the regional unit of Arcadia.

Poulithra is a traditional settlement. It is one of the last remaining tranquil, coastal villages with traditional stone houses.

== Plot ==
After a car accident, two teenagers are left stranded in rural Greece. Charlotte has a deep desire to find connection, but hides behind a sullen disposition and her new-found sexual power. Sye, her recent stepbrother, is introverted, hiding behind his camera and caustic wit. As the two wander the dusty roads and staggering beauty of Greece, they come across Benerji, an expatriate American. With no other alternative, they reluctantly accept him as their guide.

The three begin an adventurous journey toward the mystic waters on the sacred Mount Parnonas. Their journey takes them through a landscape both ancient and modern. Events force them to confront the truth of their past and the frightening, beautiful reality of their present.

== Cast ==
- Nick Nolte as Benerji
- Haley Bennett as Charlotte
- Carter Jenkins as Sye
- Dato Bakhtadze as Gorgo
- Lachlan Buchanan as Raffi
- Renos Haralambidis as hotel manager
- Anthony Burk as cook
- Alex Zorbas as Desmond
- Alexandra Pavlidou as Alisa
- David Ariniello as Charlotte's dad
- James Ivory as wedding photographer
- Nikolas Marmaras as waiter
- Olga Kyprotou as woman in white
- Anastasia Poutsela as old woman
- Arietta Valmas as girl in white
- Vassilis Drossos as truck driver

== Production ==
In September 2008, it was announced that Nolte, Bennett and Jenkins were cast in the film. Filming began in Greece on September 1, 2008.

== Reception ==
Kirk Honeycutt of the Associated Press gave the film a negative review and wrote that it “winds up only with strained seriousness.”
