= Menalou vanilia fir honey =

Honey produced in Greece

Menalou vanilia fir honey (Greek: Μέλι Ελάτης Βανίλια Μαινάλου) is a honey produced in Greece with protected destination of origin status. It contains at least 80% honey of the which will be from the black pine, and the rest will be flower honey produced in the region (<20%) with a pleasant taste and a characteristic appearance with a light colour and sheen; moisture content 14–15.5%, sucrose content <10% (8–18%).

It is produced in 24 municipalities and communities within Arcadia (district of Gortynia and Mantineia; the municipalities of Dimitsana and Lagkadia; the communities of Valtesiniko, Vytina, Elati, Zigovisti, Kamenitsa, Lasta, Magouliana, Mygdalia, Nymfasia, Pyrgaki, Rados, Stemnitsa, Syrna, Alonistaina, Vlacherna, Kardaras, Kapsas, Lykochia, Piana, Roeino, Tselepakos, and Chrysovitsi.
