= Tyros, Greece =

Tyros Τυρός
- Municipal unit
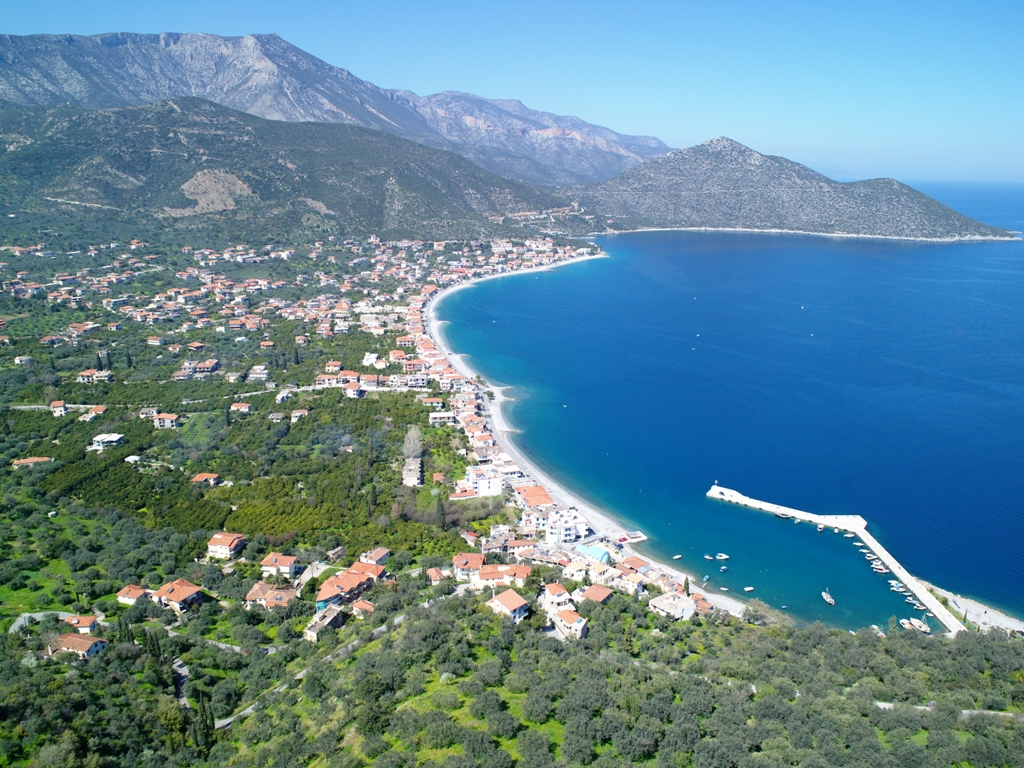

- Location within the regional unit

- Location within Greece
- Coordinates: 37°15′N 22°50′E
- Country: Greece
- Administrative region: Peloponnese
- Regional unit: Arcadia
- Municipality: South Kynouria

Area
  - Municipal unit: 88.57 km^{2} (34.20 sq mi)

Population (2021)
  - Municipal unit: 1,677
  - Municipal unit density: 18.93/km^{2} (49.04/sq mi)
  - Community: 1,019
- Time zone: UTC+2 (EET)
  - Summer (DST): UTC+3 (EEST)
- Postal code: 22029
- Area code: 27570
- Vehicle registration: TP
- Website: www.tyros.gr

Tyros (Greek: Τυρός, romanized: Tyrós, lit. 'cheese', Tsakonian: Τερέ) is a tourist and old naval town in Arcadia, Peloponnese, Greece. It is located 19 km north of Leonidio, 26 km southeast of Astros and 71 km southeast of Tripoli, lying in the heart of Kynouria, between the Parnon mountains and the Myrtoan Sea. It is considered a traditional settlement.

Since the 2011 Greek government reform it is part of the municipality South Kynouria, of which it forms the municipal unit of Tyros. The municipal unit has an area of 88.567 km^{2}. At the 2021 census, the population of the municipal unit was 1,677. The municipal unit consists of the communities Tyros, Sapounakaiika and Pera Melana.

In the region, the Tsakonian language used to be spoken. It originates from the ancient Doric dialect and is nowadays in danger of becoming extinct.

In Tyros, every Easter one of the most famous Greek traditions takes place. On Good Friday a procession of the Epitaph is held on the coastal road of the town. On Easter Saturday evening a ceremonial burning of an effigy of Judas by the sea is organized and the harbour bay of the town is filled with hundreds of small hot air balloons that symbolize the souls of lost sailors and fishermen of Tyros, and which are sent into the sky, accompanied by fireworks lit throughout the bay.

== See also ==
- List of settlements in Arcadia
- List of traditional settlements of Greece
