= Vyziki =

Vyziki Βυζίκι
- Community
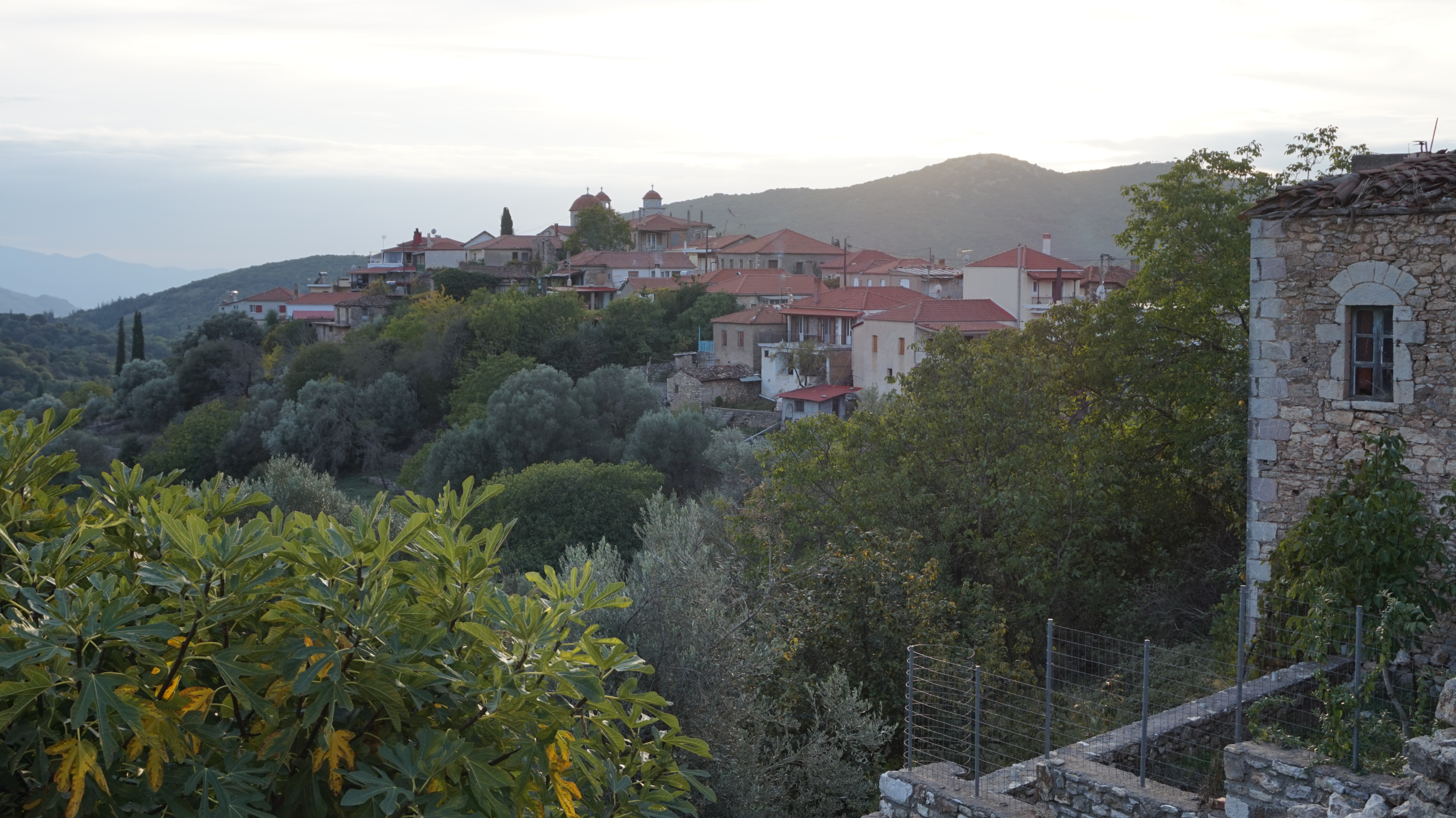

- Location within Greece
- Coordinates: 37°43′07″N 21°57′42″E
- Country: Greece
- Administrative region: Peloponnese
- Regional unit: Arcadia
- Municipality: Gortynia
- Elevation: 750 m (2,460 ft)

Population (2021)
  - Community: 152
- Time zone: UTC+2 (EET)
  - Summer (DST): UTC+3 (EEST)
- Vehicle registration: TP

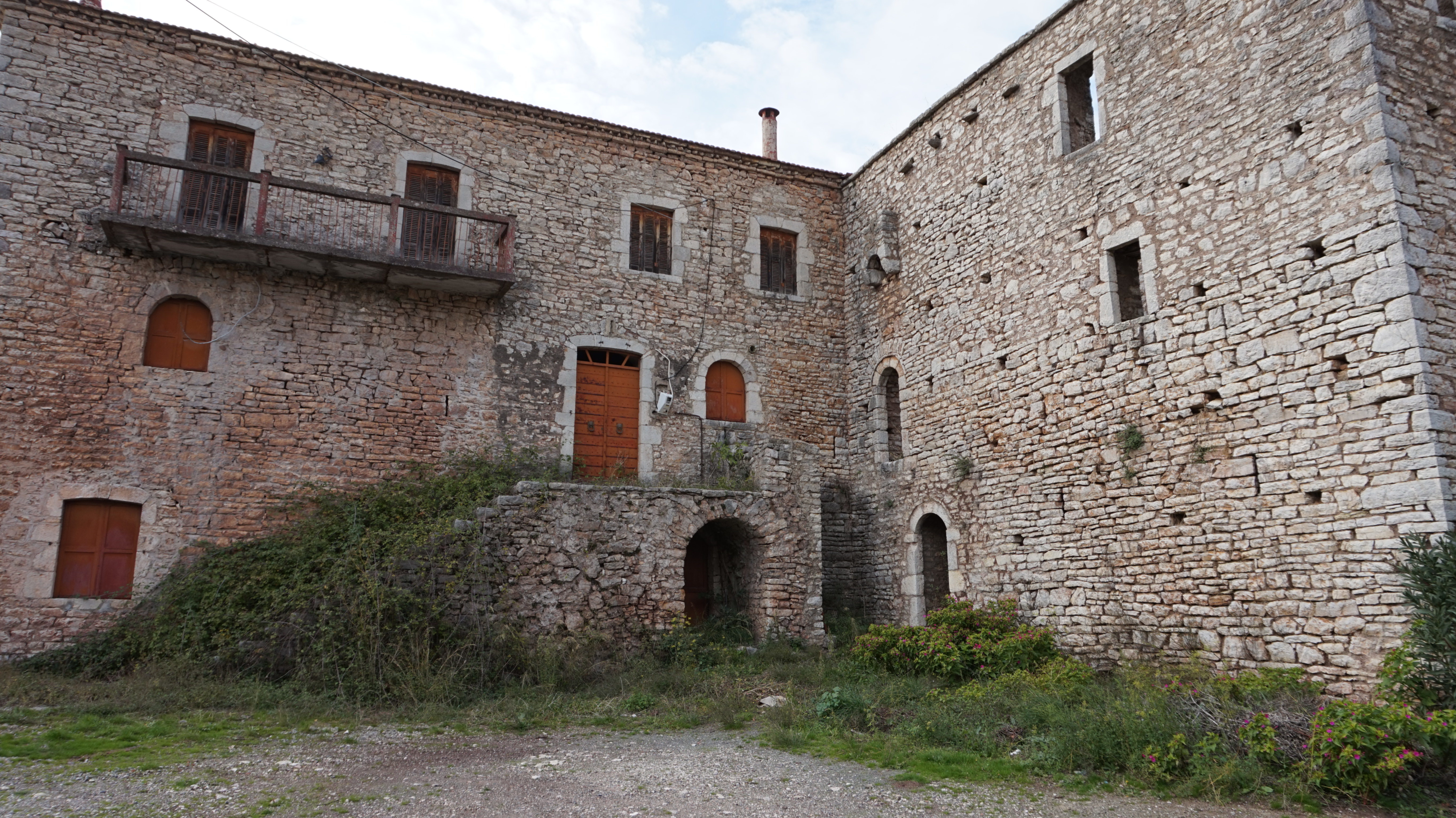
Traditional fortified house in Vyziki

Vyziki (Greek: Βυζίκι) is a mountain village in the municipal unit of Tropaia in Arcadia, Greece. It is located 85 km northwest of Tripoli, just off the midpoint of the national road EO74 which connects Tripoli to Pyrgos, and 2 km from Tropaia.

The village is built at an altitude of 750 m. Most of its houses are traditional structures made of stone, and two of them are fortified Venetian tower-houses (see picture on the right). The two central "squares" (Greek: πλατείες), the folklore museum, and the St. Nicholas Cathedral stand out among the village buildings. It has been declared a traditional settlement.

According to the latest census (2021), the number of residents is 152, most of them over aged. Major productive activities in the Vyziki area involve livestock and dairy products, with the produced milk being forwarded to the nearest arcadian cheese plants.

== Antiquities ==
The village's greater area has an elongated shape and runs from the east (near the Langadia mountains) to the west (reaching the river Ladon). On the eastern edge, are ruins of the mighty Mattegriffon, the Frankish Castle of Akova and every August – over the last 40 years – Vyziki holds cultural activities under the name "Akova Festival". In the same area, namely, inside the castle, under its foundation, and nearby, many items of antiquity have been found – columns, pottery pieces, etc. It has been suggested that it is very probable that Akova existed before the arrival of the Franks; It is located in a place inhabited in antiquity and whose occupation has had to be continuous. This could be the actual location of Ancient Teuthis, mentioned in Pausanias, as many 19th century famous travellers believed, but which nowadays has been claimed by the large village of Dimitsana.Finally, the west end of the Vyziki area enters the region of Ancient Thelpousa, a great city, which is still awaiting an official systematic excavation!
