= Poulithra =

Poulithra Πούλιθρα
- Community
- Location within Greece
- Coordinates: 37°07′N 22°53.8′E
- Country: Greece
- Administrative region: Peloponnese
- Regional unit: Arcadia
- Municipality: South Kynouria
- Municipal unit: Leonidio

Population (2021)
  - Community: 394
- Time zone: UTC+2 (EET)
  - Summer (DST): UTC+3 (EEST)

Poulithra (Greek: Πούλιθρα) is a village and a community in the municipal unit of Leonidio, southeastern Arcadia, Greece. It is situated on the Myrtoan Sea coast, at the foot of the eastern Parnon mountains. The community includes the small inland village Pyrgoudi. Poulithra is 7 km southeast of Leonidio, 14 km east of Kosmas, 19 km northwest of Kyparissi, Laconia) and 42 km east of Sparti. It is considered a traditional settlement.

== Population ==
| Year | Village population | Community population |
|---|---|---|
| 1981 | 430 | – |
| 1991 | 458 | – |
| 2001 | 598 | 600 |
| 2011 | 414 | 415 |
| 2021 | - | 394 |

== History ==
In Poulithra the ancient city of Polichne was located, which was mentioned by the historian Pausanias in his travels. An ancient castle and Byzantine walls are to be found on the hill. In 1997, the formerly independent community became part of the municipality of Leonidio, which became part of the municipality of South Kynouria in 2011.

== See also ==
- List of settlements in Arcadia
- List of traditional settlements of Greece
