= Staikos Staikopoulos =

Greek general

Staikos Staikopoulos (Greek Στάικος Σταϊκόπουλος, c. 1799–1835) was a participant in the Greek War of Independence.

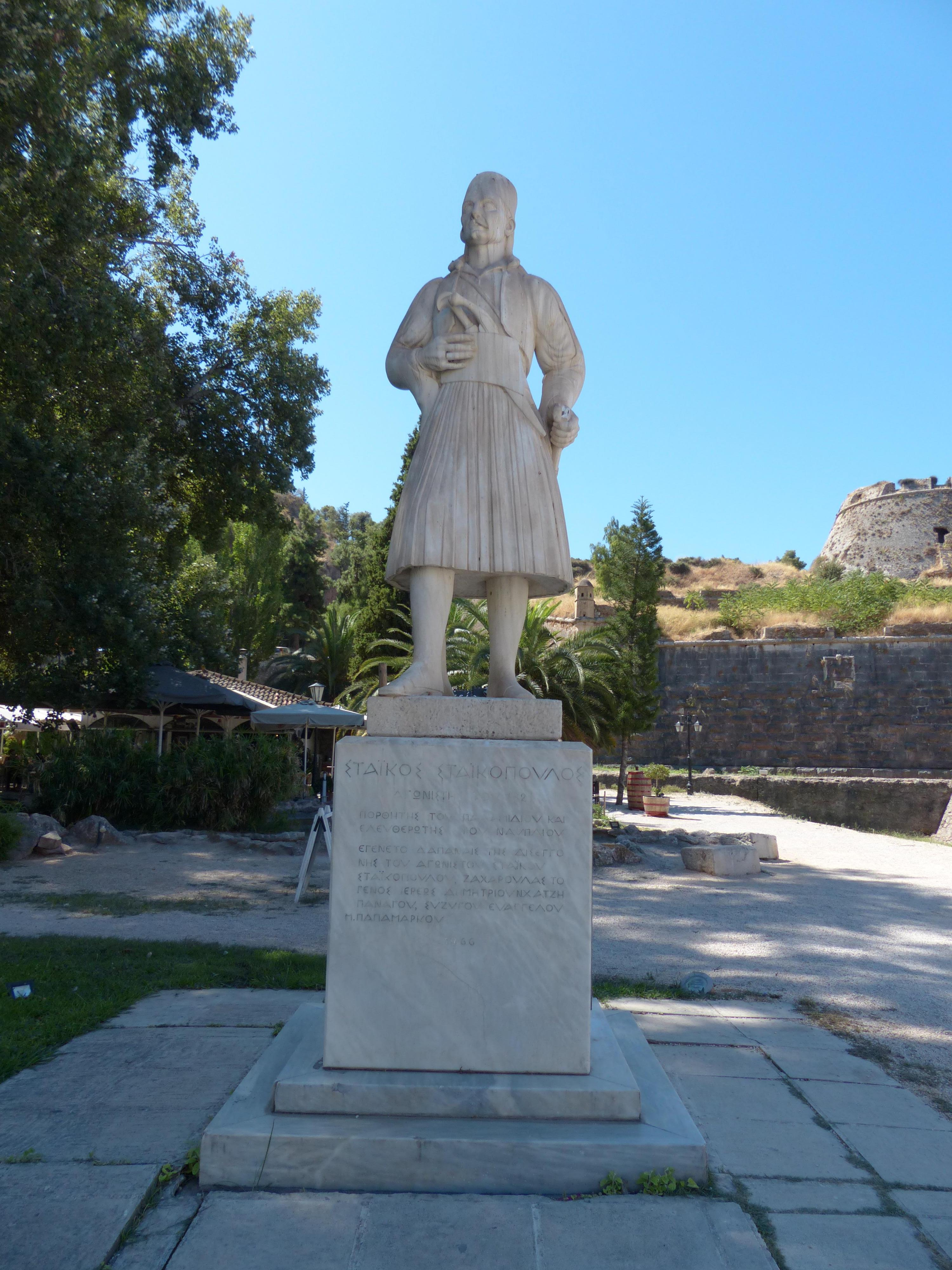
Statue of Stáikos Staïkópoulos in the park that bears his name, behind the courthouse and next to the Venetian gate

== Biography ==
Staikopoulos was born at Zatouna, Gortynia, in Arcadia and from an early age was involved in the fur trade. On the island of Hydra, where he went in 1818, he was recruited to the Filiki Eteria by Nikolaos Speliotopoulos.

In 1821, upon the outbreak of the war, he raised his own company of troops and departed Hydra for Argos. He began at once a siege of Nafplio and quickly turned one of its commanders to his side. At last on 29 November 1822, along with Demetrios Moschonesios, he took the fortress of Palamidi, the feat for which he is best remembered in the history books. Afterwards he was promoted from chiliarch to strategos (general). Following this he laid siege to the fort of Corinth, which fell under his occupation. He was the first to face Ibrahim Pasha, from whom he took thirty prisoners, who were sent to Nafplio. He had a seat in the Second National Assembly at Astros. By leave of King Othon he remained in the army, although under guard, since he was opposed to the king's government.

=== Death ===
He died on 21 February 1835, the day of his release from prison, in the guardhouse of Leonardou in Nafplio, from the wounds and hardships of war, and was buried in the old city cemetery.

=== Memorial ===
Today the municipality maintains in his honour a Staikopoulos Park, where every year on November 29 a commendation ceremony is held. In recognition of the fact that Zatouna is his birthplace and Nafplio the place of his death, the two have become sister-cities. Staikopoulos was married to Katerina Demetrakopoulou and had a daughter, Zacharoula.
