= Phedon Papamichael =

Greek cinematographer and film director

- Born: February 1962 (age 64); Athens, Greece
- Years active: 1985–present
- Spouse: Eka Chichua (m. 2006)
- Children: 2

Phedon Papamichael, ASC (Greek: Φαίδων Παπαμιχαήλ, Faidon Papamihail; born February 1962) is a Greek cinematographer and film director, known for his collaborations with directors James Mangold and Alexander Payne.

He has been nominated for two Academy Awards for Best Cinematography, for Nebraska (2013) and The Trial of the Chicago 7 (2020).

== Early life and education ==
Papamichael was born in Athens, Greece in 1962 to a Greek father and a German mother.

When he was six years old, his family relocated to the United States, as his father, a well-known artist and set designer, was offered a job as a production designer for John Cassavetes.

He studied photography and art at LMU Munich and received his Bachelor in Fine Arts in 1982.

== Career ==
Papamichael's first job as a cinematographer was in the 1988 film Dance of the Damned, directed by Katt Shea. He would go on to make several future collaborations with director Shea and producer Roger Corman, making him a member of the so-called "Corman Film School", much like his contemporary Janusz Kamiński.

He made his debut as a director with the film Sketch Artist, and later directed Dark Side of Genius, From Within and Arcadia Lost.

In 2000, he was awarded the Prix Vision of the Avignon Film Festival for his cinematography in 27 Missing Kisses.

He has been a member of the American Society of Cinematographers since 2000.

== Personal life ==
He spends his time between Los Angeles and Leonidio, Greece.

In an interview with Greek Reporter, Papamichael said, ”I want to spend more time in Greece from next year. My parents live there and my home is also there. I visit Los Angeles regularly just for my job. Obviously, I will move permanently to Leonidio some time in the future. It’s unlikely to live the twilight of my life in the United States.” He also has a wife and two children.

== Filmography ==
=== Cinematographer ===
==== Film ====
Year	Title	Director	Notes
1989	Stripped to Kill II: Live Girls	Katt Shea	
1989	Nowhere to Run	Carl Franklin	
1989	Dance of the Damned	Katt Shea	
1989	After Midnight	Ken Wheat; Jim Wheat	
1990	Streets	Katt Shea	
1990	Body Chemistry	Kristine Peterson	
1990	Prayer of the Rollerboys	Rick King	
1991	Driving Me Crazy	Jon Turteltaub	
1992	Poison Ivy	Katt Shea	
1993	Cool Runnings	Jon Turteltaub	
1994	Dark Side of Genius	Himself	
1995	While You Were Sleeping	Jon Turteltaub	
1995	Unstrung Heroes	Diane Keaton	
1996	Bio-Dome	Jason Bloom	
1996	Phenomenon	Jon Turteltaub	
1996	Unhook the Stars	Nick Cassavetes	
1997	The Locusts	John Patrick Kelley	
1997	Mouse Hunt	Gore Verbinski	
1998	Patch Adams	Tom Shadyac	
2000	The Million Dollar Hotel	Wim Wenders	
2000	27 Missing Kisses	Nana Djordjadze	
2001	America's Sweethearts	Joe Roth	
2002	Moonlight Mile	Brad Silberling	
2003	Identity	James Mangold	1st collaboration with Mangold
2004	Sideways	Alexander Payne	1st collaboration with Payne
2005	Walk the Line	James Mangold	
2005	The Weather Man	Gore Verbinski	
2006	10 Items or Less	Brad Silberling	
2006	The Pursuit of Happyness	Gabriele Muccino	
2006	Mathilde	Nina Mimica	With Stefano Paradiso
2007	3:10 to Yuma	James Mangold	
2008	W.	Oliver Stone	
2009	Arcadia Lost	Himself	
2010	Knight and Day	James Mangold	
2011	The Ides of March	George Clooney	
2011	The Descendants	Alexander Payne	
2012	This Is 40	Judd Apatow	
2013	Nebraska	Alexander Payne	
2014	The Monuments Men	George Clooney	
2016	The Huntsman: Winter's War	Cedric Nicolas-Troyan	
2017	Downsizing	Alexander Payne	
2019	Ford v Ferrari	James Mangold	
2020	The Trial of the Chicago 7	Aaron Sorkin	
2021	Brighton 4th	Levan Koguashvili	
2023	Indiana Jones and the Dial of Destiny	James Mangold	
2023	Daddio	Christy Hall	
2023	Light Falls	Himself	With Akis Konstantakopoulos
2024	A Complete Unknown	James Mangold	

==== Television ====
Year	Title	Director	Notes
1993	Wild Palms	Peter Hewitt; Keith Gordon; Kathryn Bigelow; Phil Joanou	Miniseries
1995	White Dwarf	Peter Markle	TV movie
1995	The Conversation	Dean Parisot	TV movie
2006	Men in Trees	James Mangold	Episode "Pilot"

=== Director ===
Year	Title	Director	Producer	Notes
1992	Sketch Artist	Yes	No	TV movie
1994	Dark Side of Genius	Yes	No	
2008	From Within	Yes	No	
2009	Arcadia Lost	Yes	No	
2012	Lost Angeles	Yes	Yes	
2016	A Beautiful Day	Yes	Yes	Short film
2023	Light Falls	Yes	Yes	

== Awards and nominations ==
Year	Title	Award	Category	Result
2013	Academy Awards	Best Cinematography	Nebraska	Nominated
2020	Academy Awards	Best Cinematography	The Trial of the Chicago 7	Nominated
2013	BAFTA Awards	Best Cinematography	Nebraska	Nominated
2019	BAFTA Awards	Best Cinematography	Ford v Ferrari	Nominated
2013	American Society of Cinematographers	Outstanding Achievement in Cinematography	Nebraska	Nominated
2019	American Society of Cinematographers	Outstanding Achievement in Cinematography	Ford v Ferrari	Nominated
2020	American Society of Cinematographers	Outstanding Achievement in Cinematography	The Trial of the Chicago 7	Nominated
2024	American Society of Cinematographers	Outstanding Achievement in Cinematography	A Complete Unknown	Nominated

=== Other awards ===
As cinematographer

Year	Title	Award/Nomination
2000	27 Missing Kisses	Avignon Prix Vision; Nominated–Camerimage Golden Frog
2000	The Million Dollar Hotel	Nominated–Camerimage Golden Frog
2005	Walk the Line	Camerimage Presidents' Award; Nominated–Camerimage Golden Frog
2013	Nebraska	BSC Award for Best Cinematography in a Feature Film; Nominated–Critics' Choice Movie Award for Best Cinematography; Nominated–Camerimage Golden Frog; Nominated–IndieWire Critics Poll Award for Best Cinematography; Nominated–National Society of Film Critics Award for Best Cinematography; Nominated–New York Film Critics Circle Award for Best Cinematography; Nominated–San Francisco Film Critics Circle Award for Best Cinematography; Nominated–St. Louis Film Critics Association Award for Best Cinematography
2019	Ford v Ferrari	Nominated–Critics' Choice Movie Award for Best Cinematography; Nominated–North Texas Film Critics Association Award for Best Cinematography; Nominated–San Diego Film Critics Society Award for Best Cinematography; Nominated–Satellite Award for Best Cinematography

As director

Year	Title	Award/Nomination
2008	From Within	Festival of Fantastic Films Special Commendation Award; Gérardmer Critics Award for Best Feature Film
2009	Arcadia Lost	Nominated–Orpheus Award for Best Feature Film; Nominated–German Independence Audience Award
2016	A Beautiful Day	Rhode Island Festival First Prize for Best Short Film; Rhode Island Festival Audience Award for Best Short Film; Van Vlahakis Award for Best Short Film
