= Akova Castle =

Coordinates: 37.7176°N 21.9881°E

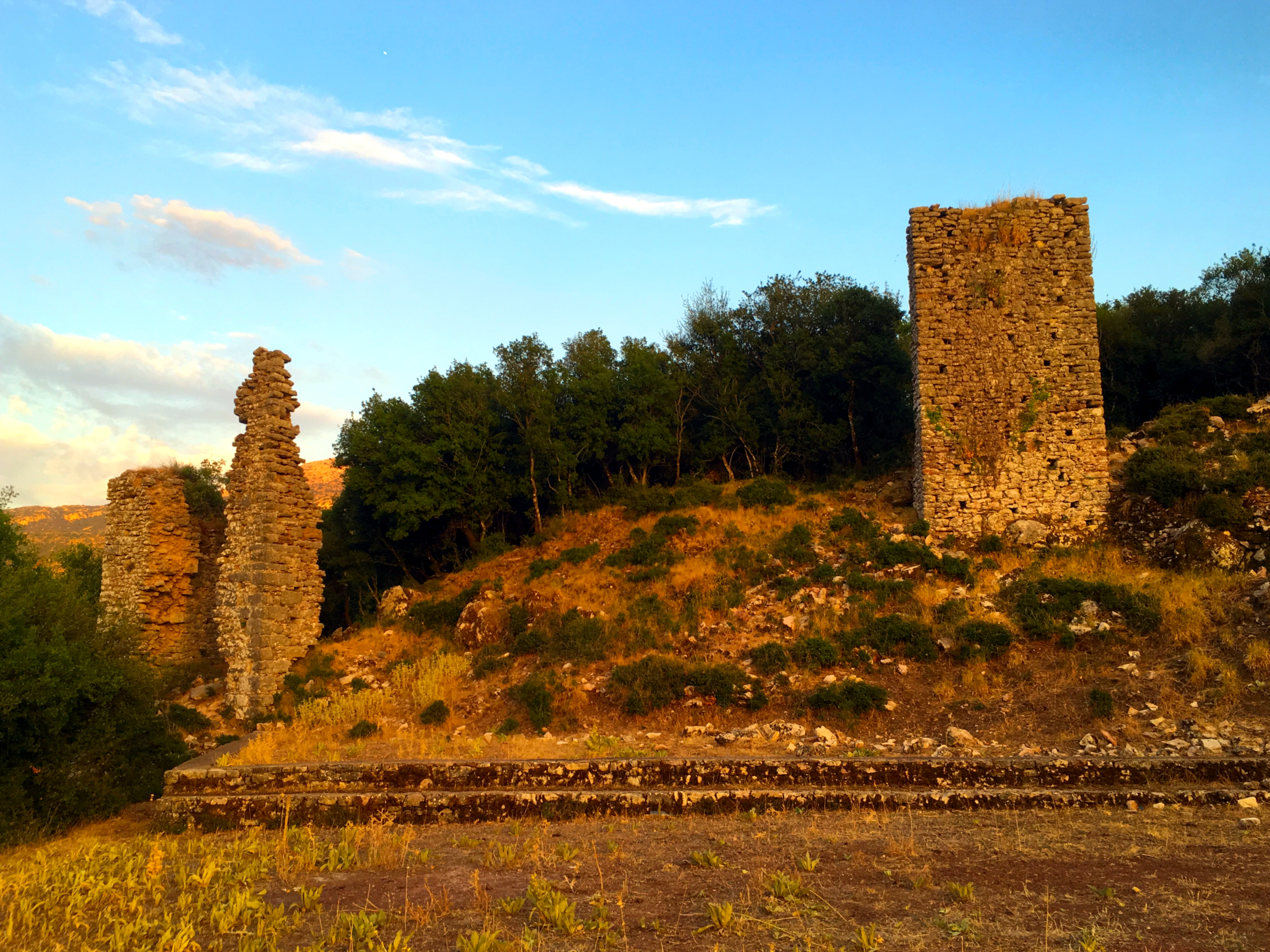
View of the ruins of the Akova Castle

The Akova Castle (Greek: Κάστρο της Άκοβας) is a medieval fortification in Gortynia, Arcadia, Greece. The medieval castle, also known as Mattegriffon, is built on top of a steep hill, inaccessible from the three sides.

The castle was the centre of the Barony of Akova, one of the most important lordships of the Frankish Principality of Achaea, established in the Morea after the Fourth Crusade. Below the castle are ruins of an unidentified ancient acropolis, possibly ancient Teuthis.

For the last 40 years, Akova has been the site of a summer festival, involving theatrical plays and other cultural activities, hosted by the nearby village of Vyziki.

== Sources ==
- Bon, Antoine (1969). La Morée franque. Recherches historiques, topographiques et archéologiques sur la principauté d’Achaïe (in French). Paris: De Boccard.
- Miller, William (1921). Essays on the Latin Orient. Cambridge: Cambridge University Press.
