= Leonardos Leonardopoulos =

Greek fighter of the Greek Revolution

Leonardos Leonardopoulos was a Greek fighter of the Greek Revolution. He descended from Zatouna.

Before the Greek Revolution he was a merchant, and a blood brother of Theodoros Kolokotronis. During the war he contributed with a substantial amount of munitions.

== Sources ==
- "Νεώτερον Εγκυκλοπαιδικόν Λεξικόν Ηλίου" vol. 12, p. 217.
