= Rizospilia =

Rizospilia Ριζοσπηλιά
- Community
- Location within Greece
- Coordinates: 37°34′N 21°57′E
- Country: Greece
- Administrative region: Peloponnese
- Regional unit: Arcadia
- Municipality: Gortynia
- Municipal unit: Dimitsana

Population (2021)
  - Community: 53
- Time zone: UTC+2 (EET)
  - Summer (DST): UTC+3 (EEST)
- Vehicle registration: TP

Rizospilia (Greek: Ριζοσπηλιά, before 1927: Στρούζα - Strouza) is a mountain village and a community in the municipal unit Dimitsana, western Arcadia, Greece. The community of Rizospilia consists of the villages Rizospilia and Kato Rizospilia (former name Mikrochori). It is situated in a remote, mountainous area. It is 3 km northeast of the river Alfeios, 8 km southwest of Dimitsana, 10 km northeast of Andritsaina and 12 km northwest of Karytaina.

== Population ==
Year	Population village	Population community
2001	33	55
2011	33	51
2021	27	53

== Tourism ==
South-east of Rizospilia, and en route to Paliokastro, is an archaeological site with ancient Mycenaean monuments. One of the largest of its kind, this site is home to numerous tombs of Mycenaean historical figures.

== See also ==
- List of settlements in Arcadia
