= Maries =

Maries may refer to:

- Maries, Thasos, village in Greece
- Maries, Zakynthos, village in Greece
- Maries County, Missouri
- Maries River, Missouri
- Charles Maries (1851–1902), English botanist
  - Maries fir, native to mountains of Japan, named after Charles Maries

== See also ==
- St. Maries, Idaho
