= Melissopetra =

Melissopetra (Greek: Μελισσόπετρα) may refer to the following places in Greece:

- Melissopetra, Arcadia, a village in the municipal unit Dimitsana, Arcadia
- Melissopetra, Ioannina, a village in the municipal unit Konitsa, Ioannina regional unit
