= Torthyneum =

Coordinates: 37°42′36″N 22°09′11″E

Torthyneum or Torthyneon (Ancient Greek: Τορθύνεον), or Torthyneium or Torthyneion (Τορθύνειον), was a town of ancient Arcadia. It is contained in ancient epigraphic mentions: the appointment of a theorodokos of Torthyneum is mentioned in an inscription at Delphi, dated to the end of the 5th century or the beginning of the 4th century BCE; an inscription at Orchomenus that could be dated around the years 369-361 BCE; and in an inscription of Aetolia of around the years 262-236 BCE which names a resident of Tortineo as proxenos.

Its site is located with ruins found north of Kamenitsa, northeast of Lasta.
