= List of traditional settlements of Greece =

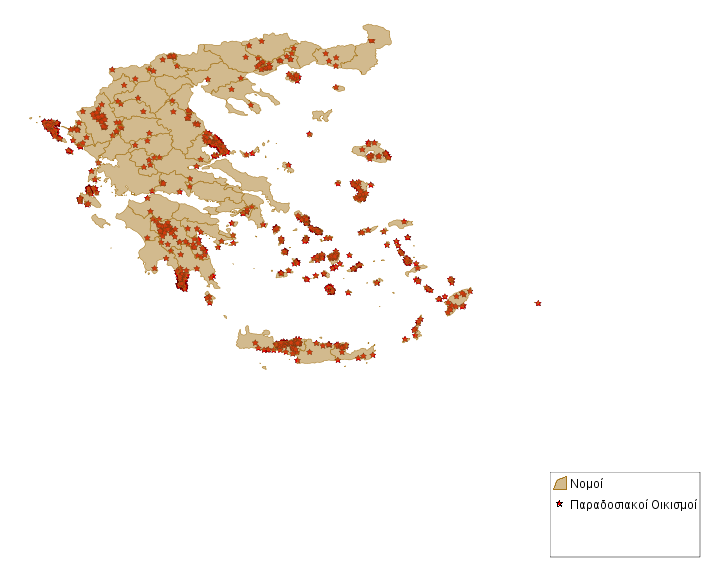
Map showing the dispersion of traditional villages in Greece

Traditional settlements in Greece are considered those settlements that have retained their unchanged image of the past, as well as their local character. Around 830 traditional settlements have been designated under the responsibility of the Ministry for the Environment, Physical Planning and Public Works, while the Deputy Minister for Macedonia and Thrace and the Ministry for the Aegean also have the authority to declare traditional settlements.

The following is a list of traditional settlements in Greece categorised by regional units:

== Achaea ==
- Alepochori
- Patras (some parts of the city)
- Vesini

== Aetolia-Acarnania ==
- Nafpaktos

== Andros ==
- Andros
- Apoikia
- Batsi
- Fallika
- Katakalaioi
- Lamyra
- Livadia
- Melida
- Menites
- Mesa Chorio
- Mesathourion
- Messaria
- Stenies
- Strapouries
- Vourkoti
- Vrachnos
- Ypsila

== Arcadia ==
- Agios Andreas
- Agios Petros
- Agridi
- Alonistaina
- Ano Doliana
- Atsicholos
- Chrysovitsi
- Dimitsana
- Dyrrachio
- Elati
- Isaris
- Kardaras
- Karytaina
- Kastanitsa
- Kato Doliana
- Kerasia
- Kontovazaina
- Kosmas
- Kounoupia
- Langadia
- Lasta
- Leonidio
- Leontari
- Lefkochori
- Magouliana
- Melissopetra
- Paralio Astros
- Paraloggi
- Pera Melana
- Piana
- Platanos
- Poulithra
- Pragmateftis
- Prastos
- Pirgaki
- Rados
- Rizes
- Roino
- Sapounakeika
- Sitaina
- Stemnitsa
- Tyros
- Valtesiniko
- Valtetsi
- Vlachokerasia
- Vlahorraptis
- Vloggos
- Vytina
- Vyziki
- Xiropigado
- Zatouna
- Zygovisti

== Argolis ==
- Argos (part of the city)
- Ermioni (Mandrakia beach, Bisti)
- Karia
- Nafplio

== Boeotia ==
- Arachova

== Central Macedonia ==
- Thessaloniki (parts of city)
- Sykies

== Corfu ==
- Agios Mattheos
- Agios Prokopios
- Ano Garouna
- Argyrades
- Avliotes
- Chlomos
- Corfu (city)
- Doukades
- Gardelades
- Gastouri
- Giannades
- Gimari
- Kalami
- Kastellanoi
- Katsimatika
- Kentroma
- Kiprianades
- Kouloura
- Kouramades
- Lakones
- Liapades
- Magazia
- Marathias
- Pelekas
- Peroulades
- Sinarades
- Varipatades
- Viros
- Vlachopoulatika

== Drama ==
- Perithorio
- Pagoneri

== Grevena ==
- Diporo
- Kalloni, Grevena

== Evros ==
- Metaxades
- Paliouri
- Samothrace

== Euboea ==
- Agios Ioannis
- Kymi
- Skyros

== Evrytania ==
- Domianoi
- Fidakia
- Fourna
- Karpenisi

== Elis ==
- Taxiarches

== Heraklion ==
- Ethia
- Heraklion (parts of the city)
- Hersonissos
- Kainourgio
- Koutouloufari
- Matala
- Piskopiano
- Prinias

== Ioannina ==
- Ano Pedina
- Aristi
- Asprangeloi
- Dikorfo
- Dolo
- Elati
- Elafotopos
- Fragkades
- Gannadio
- Ioannina
- Kalarrytes
- Kaloutas
- Kapesovo
- Kato Pedina
- Kipoi
- Koukouli
- Manasses
- Metsovo
- Monodendri
- Negades
- Papingo
- Raftanei
- Skamneli
- Syrrako
- Tsepelovo
- Vikos, Ioannina
- Vitsa
- Vradeto

== Kalymnos ==
- Agia Marina (Leros)
- Alinda (Leros)
- Chora (Astypalaia)
- Emporio (Kalymnos)
- Lakki (Leros)
- Livadi
- Partheni (Leros)
- Platanos (Leros)
- Pothia (Kalymnos)
- Vathi (Kalymnos)
- Chora (Patmos)

== Karditsa ==
- Ellinopyrgos
- Rentina

== Karpathos ==
- Aperi
- Volada
- Karpathos
- Lefkos
- Mesochori
- Othos
- Olympos, Karpathos
- Tristomos
- Finiki
- Fri
- Poli (Kasos)

== Kastoria ==
- Kastoria
- Vogatsiko

== Kavala ==
- Chrisokastro
- Domatia
- Kavala (parts of the city)
- Kechrokambos
- Kipia
- Korifes
- Kryoneri (Kavala)
- Makrychori (Kavala)
- Melissokomeio
- Mesoropi
- Moustheni
- Palaoichori (Kavala)
- Platamonas (Kavala)
- Podochori
- Zygos

== Cephalonia ==
- Asos
- Fiskardo
- Karia
- Vari

== Kos ==
- Antimakheia
- Asfendiou
- Emporios (Nisyros)
- Kos
- Mandraki
- Nikia (Nisyros)
- Pali (Nisyros)
- Pyli

== Rhodes ==
- Afantou
- Agios Isidoros, Rhodes
- Archangelos
- Arnitha (Rhodes)
- Asklipieio (Rhodes)
- Chora (Symi)
- Chorio (Chalki)
- Eleousa (Rhodes)
- Emporeious (Chalki)
- Gennadi (Rhodes)
- Kastellorizo (Megisti)
- Kattavia (Rhodes)
- Kiotari (Rhodes)
- Koskinou (Rhodes)
- Lindos
- Livadia (Tilos)
- Mesanagros
- Mikro Chorio (Tiros)
- Monolithos, Greece
- Profilia (Rhodes)
- Psinthos (Rhodes)
- Rhodes (city)
- Siana (Rhodes)
- Vati (Rhodes)
- Yialos (Symi)

== Thasos ==
- Alyki
- Kasto
- Maries
- Palaochori
- Panagia
- Potamia
- Prinos
- Theologos

== Thesprotia ==
- Faneromeni
- Finiki
- Giromeri
- Kamitsani
- Margariti
- Paramythia
- Plesio
- Sagiada

== Thessaloniki ==
- Ano Poli
- Sykies
