= Lasta, Greece =

Village in Arcadia, Greece

Lasta Λάστα
- Community
- Location within Greece
- Coordinates: 37°42′N 22°08′E
- Country: Greece
- Administrative region: Peloponnese
- Regional unit: Arcadia
- Municipality: Gortynia
- Municipal unit: Vytina

Population (2021)
  - Community: 12
- Time zone: UTC+2 (EET)
  - Summer (DST): UTC+3 (EEST)

Lasta (Greek: Λάστα) is a small mountain village and a community in the municipal unit of Vytina, Gortynia, Arcadia, Greece. It is considered a traditional settlement and is 6 km northwest of Vytina. The community consists of the villages Lasta and Agridaki.

== See also ==
- List of settlements in Arcadia
- List of traditional settlements of Greece
