= Zygovisti =

Zygovisti Ζυγοβίστι
- Community
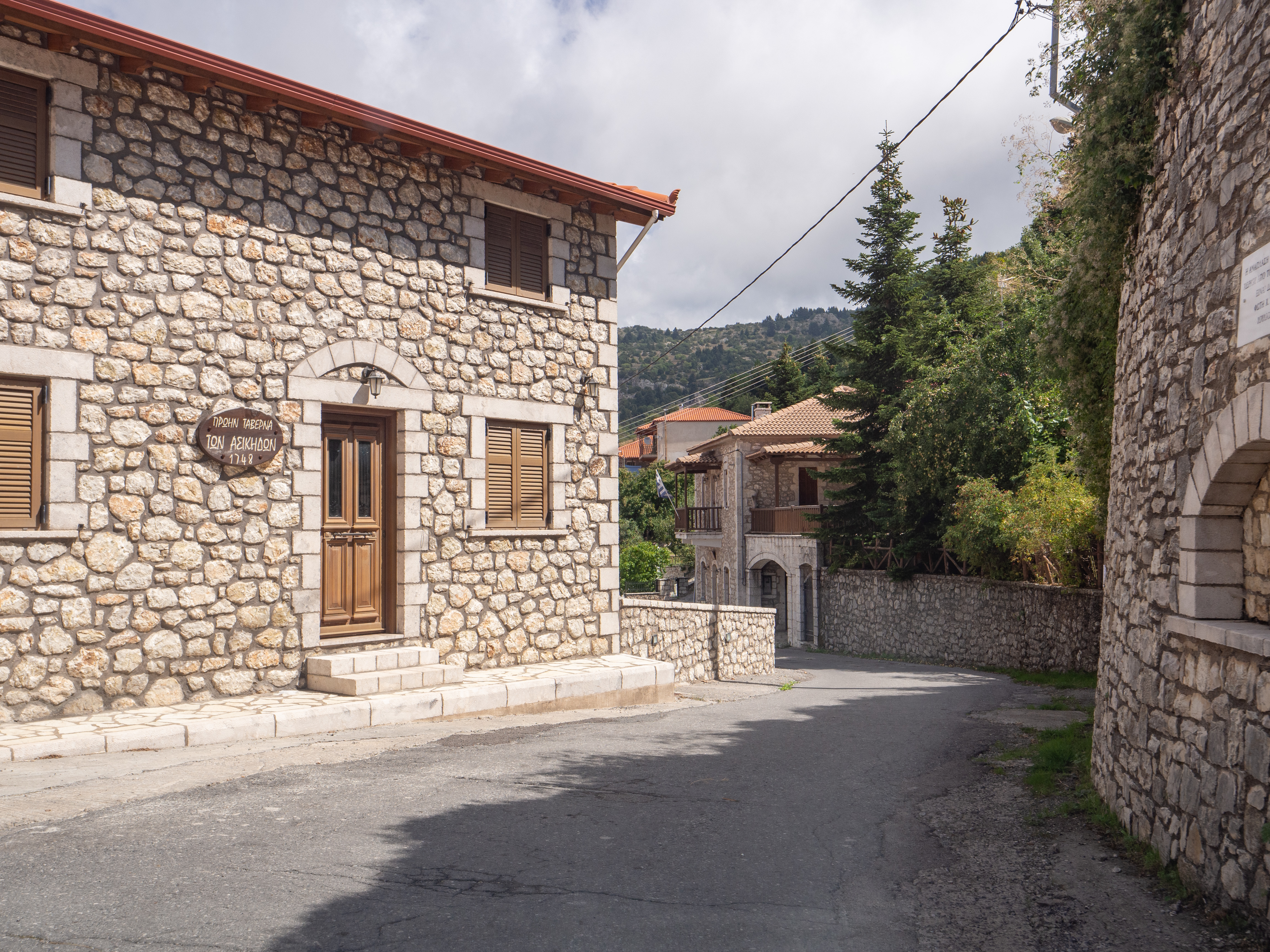
- The main street of the village, leading to the square

- Location within Greece
- Coordinates: 37°35′15″N 22°04′05″E
- Country: Greece
- Administrative region: Peloponnese
- Regional unit: Arcadia
- Municipality: Gortynia
- Municipal unit: Dimitsana

Area
  - Community: 14.98 km^{2} (5.78 sq mi)
- Elevation: 1,160 m (3,810 ft)

Population (2021)
  - Community: 27
  - Density: 1.8/km^{2} (4.7/sq mi)
- Time zone: UTC+2 (EET)
  - Summer (DST): UTC+3 (EEST)
- Vehicle registration: TP

Zygovisti (Greek: Ζυγοβίστι, also Ζιγοβίστι Zigovisti) is a village in the municipal unit Dimitsana, western Arcadia, Greece. It is located in the mountains east of the river Lousios, 3 km southeast of Dimitsana and 4 km north of Stemnitsa. At 1160 m elevation, it is one of the highest villages in Greece. There is a large marble book in the village square, commemorating the Greek War of Independence. It is considered a traditional settlement.

== "The Zygovistian Immortals" ==
When the Greek War of Independence broke out in 1821, 197 men from Zygovisti were among the first to serve Greek General Theodoros Kolokotronis. Due to their unwavering loyalty and courage, General Kolokotronis nicknamed them "The Immortals."

The Marble Book in the village square contains the names of all 197 Immortals.

An 1825 letter, forwarded to General Kolokotronis, serves as historical evidence as to how close the members of the Immortal Body were to the General. The letter was forwarded by Ioannis Skarmeas, a Zygovistian, who updates the General of the current situation at a base in Bertzova (modern day Partheni, Arcadia).

== Historical population ==
Year	Population
1981	154
1991	131
2001	142
2011	79
2021	27

== See also ==
- List of settlements in Arcadia
- List of traditional settlements of Greece
