= Kosmas, Greece =

Kosmas Κοσμάς
- Municipal unit
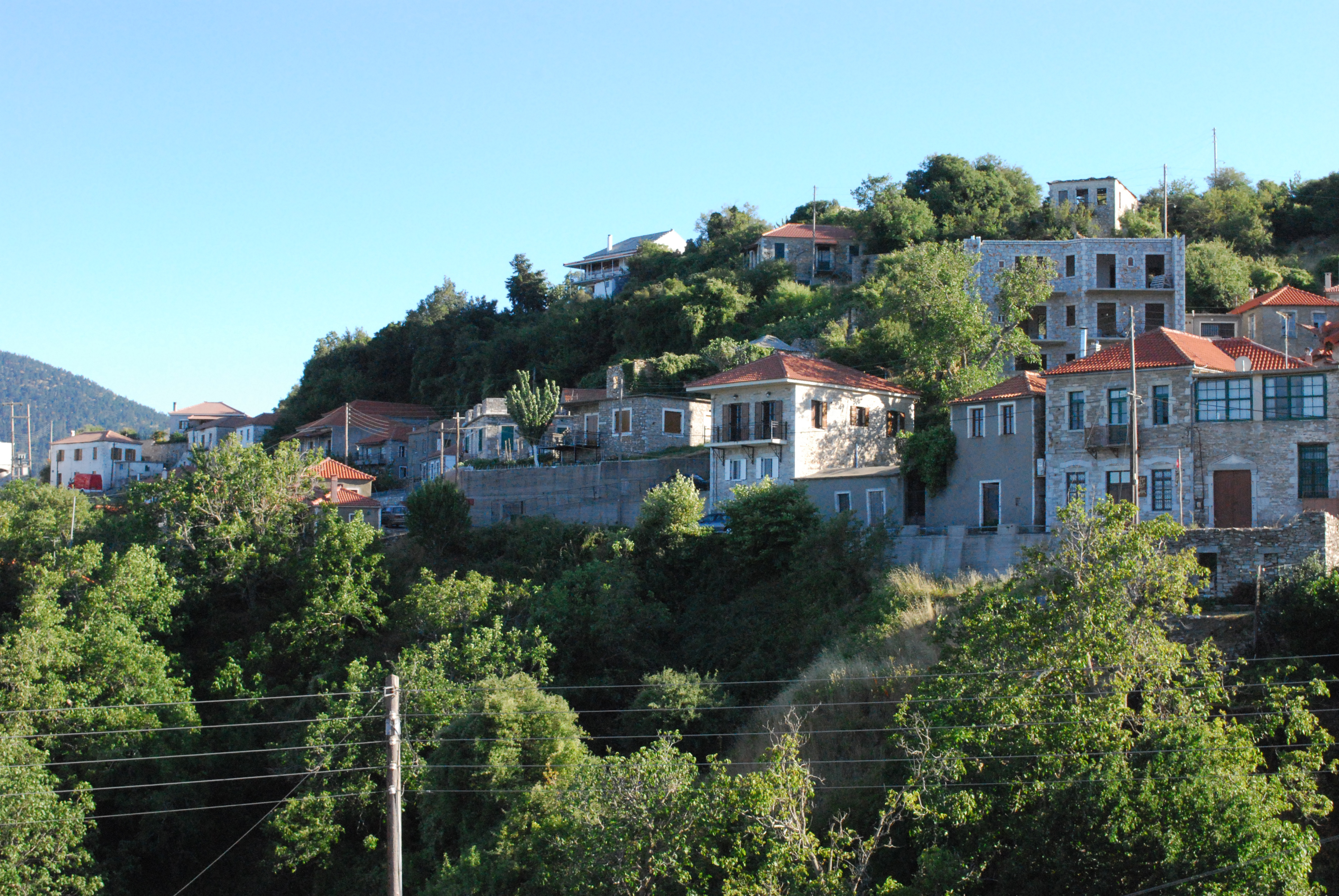

- Location within the regional unit

- Location within Greece
- Coordinates: 37°06′N 22°44′E
- Country: Greece
- Administrative region: Peloponnese
- Regional unit: Arcadia
- Municipality: South Kynouria

Area
  - Municipal unit: 85.22 km^{2} (32.90 sq mi)

Population (2021)
  - Municipal unit: 253
  - Municipal unit density: 2.97/km^{2} (7.69/sq mi)
- Time zone: UTC+2 (EET)
  - Summer (DST): UTC+3 (EEST)
- Vehicle registration: TP

Kosmas (Greek: Κοσμάς) is a mountain village and a former community in Arcadia, Peloponnese, Greece. It is considered a traditional settlement. Since the 2011 local government reform it is part of the municipality South Kynouria, of which it is a municipal unit. The municipal unit has an area of 85.220 km^{2}. Kosmas is situated in the southeastern part of the Parnon mountains, at about 1150 m elevation, on the road from Skala (Laconia) to Leonidio. It is 13 km southwest of Leonidio, 28 km east of Sparti, 28 km northeast of Skala, 35 km south of Argos and 57 km southeast of Tripoli. Kosmas has a school, a church and a library.

== Population ==
Year	Population
1981	594
1991	657
2001	591
2011	362
2021	253

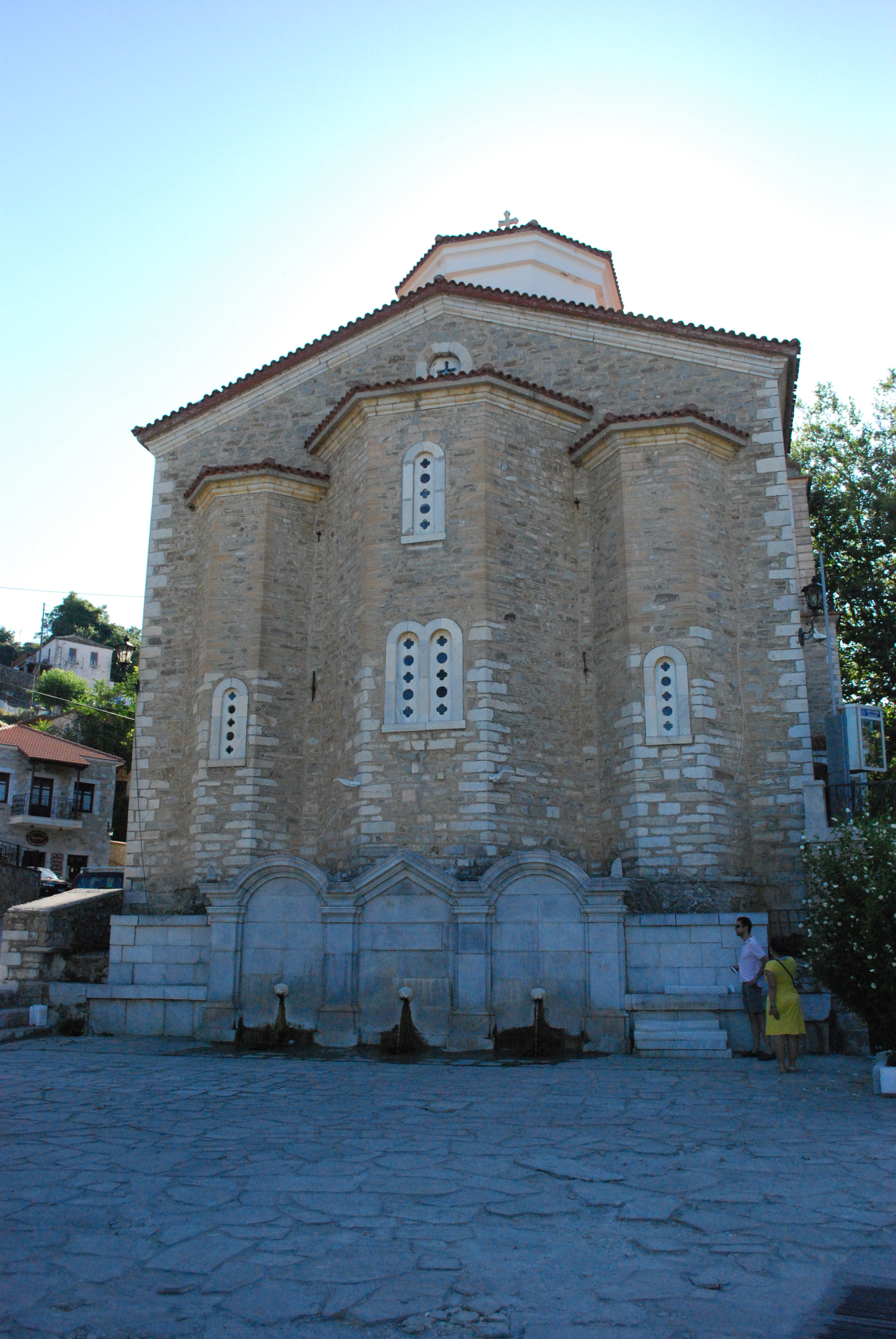
View of the church.

== History ==
In the area which is now known as Kosmas was the ancient city of Selinous, which had a temple of Apollo. Kosmas was first mentioned in 1592 in a letter of Gennadios, metropolitan of Monemvasia. Many inhabitants of Kosmas participated in the Greek War of Independence. The village suffered destruction during World War II and the Greek Civil War (1946-1949).

== See also ==
- List of settlements in Arcadia
- List of traditional settlements of Greece
