= Propantes =

Cave in Mount Parnon, Greece

Propantes is a pothole on the mountain of Parnon within the borders of the Paliochori community of the Municipality of Leonidio in Greece. The entrance is about three by seven metres wide. The entrance shaft drops to -289m without the need for a re-belay, making it the deepest daylight shaft in mainland Greece. The shaft was first explored using modern caving single rope techniques in the early 1980s by a Polish team and the exploration repeated soon after by veteran Greek caver Petros Romanas. All subsequent visits for many years halted at the deepest point leading off the main shaft at -310m. Between 1998 and 2001, the depth of the pothole was surveyed to -316m following exploration carried out by SELAS caving club of Greece. This exploration followed leads in the form of windows coming off the main shaft. In 2005 and 2006, teams from SELAS continued the exploration in the main shaft beyond the squeeze which had halted previous exploration at -316m. The current surveyed depth of the cave is -360m with leads still to be explored.

The pothole appears on many on-line deep cave lists (usually something reserved for caves deeper than -400m) as it had originally been erroneously reported as being deeper than the 400m required to be published in these lists.

Exploration is ongoing.

The pothole has been known since antiquity and was used during World War II and subsequent Greek Civil War as a convenient place of execution.
