= Zatouna =

Zatouna Ζάτουνα
- Community
- Location within Greece
- Coordinates: 37°35.4′N 22°1.4′E
- Country: Greece
- Administrative region: Peloponnese
- Regional unit: Arcadia
- Municipality: Gortynia
- Municipal unit: Dimitsana

Population (2021)
  - Community: 72
- Time zone: UTC+2 (EET)
  - Summer (DST): UTC+3 (EEST)
- Postal code: 22007
- Vehicle registration: TP

Zatouna (Greek: Ζάτουνα) is a mountain village and a community in the municipal unit of Dimitsana, western Arcadia, Peloponnese, Greece. It is situated on a mountain slope at about 1000 m elevation, west of the river Lousios. The community includes the nearby villages Markos and Vlongos. Zatouna is 2 km southwest of Dimitsana and 23 km northwest of Megalopoli. It is considered a traditional settlement.

== Population ==
Year	Population village	Population community
1981	160	-
1991	103	-
2001	75	208
2011	45	71
2021	42	72

== People ==
Zatouna is the birthplace of Staikos Staikopoulos, who laid siege to the castle of Palamidi in 1821 while it was under Turkish control. The Greek composer Mikis Theodorakis was banished to the village in 1968 by the military junta. Famous Greek actor Mimis Fotopoulos (1913–1986) was born in Zatouna.

== See also ==
- List of settlements in Arcadia
- List of traditional settlements of Greece
