= Kardaras =

Kardaras Καρδαράς
- Community
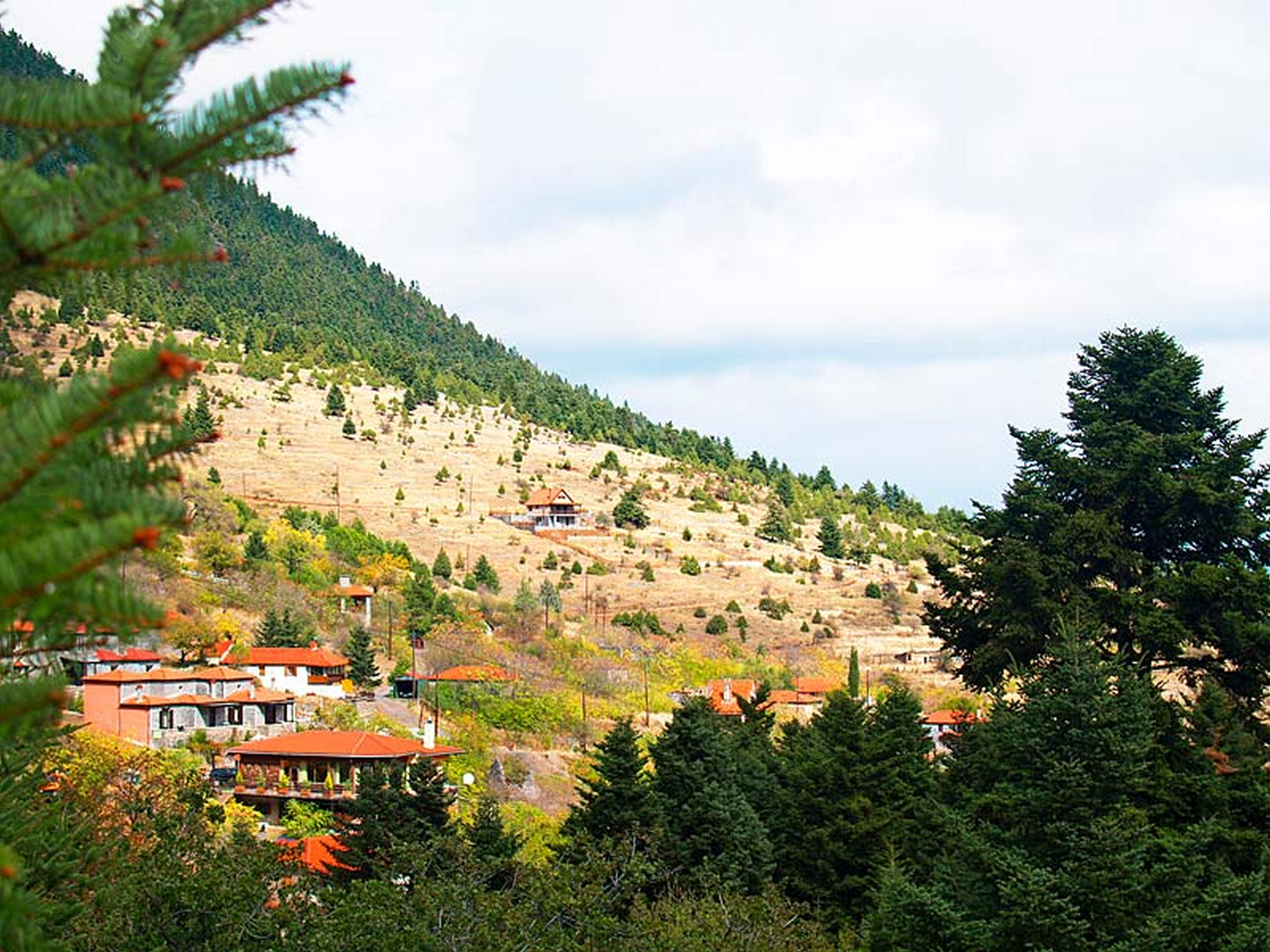

- Location within Greece
- Coordinates: 37°37.7′N 22°17.7′E
- Country: Greece
- Administrative region: Peloponnese
- Regional unit: Arcadia
- Municipality: Tripoli
- Municipal unit: Levidi
- Elevation: 1,030 m (3,380 ft)

Population (2021)
  - Community: 21
- Time zone: UTC+2 (EET)
  - Summer (DST): UTC+3 (EEST)
- Vehicle registration: TP

Kardaras (Greek: Καρδαράς) is a mountain village in the municipal unit of Levidi, Arcadia, Greece. It is situated in the eastern foothills of the Mainalo mountains, at 1,030 m elevation and is considered a traditional settlement.It is 5 km northwest of Kapsas, 6 km south of Levidi, 6 km east of Alonistaina and 15 km northwest of Tripoli. The Greek National Road 74 (Tripoli – Olympia – Pyrgos) passes east of the village.

== Population ==
Year	Population
1981	5
1991	88
2001	47
2011	20
2021	21

== See also ==
- List of settlements in Arcadia
- List of traditional settlements of Greece
