= Maries, Thasos =

Maries Μαριές
- Community
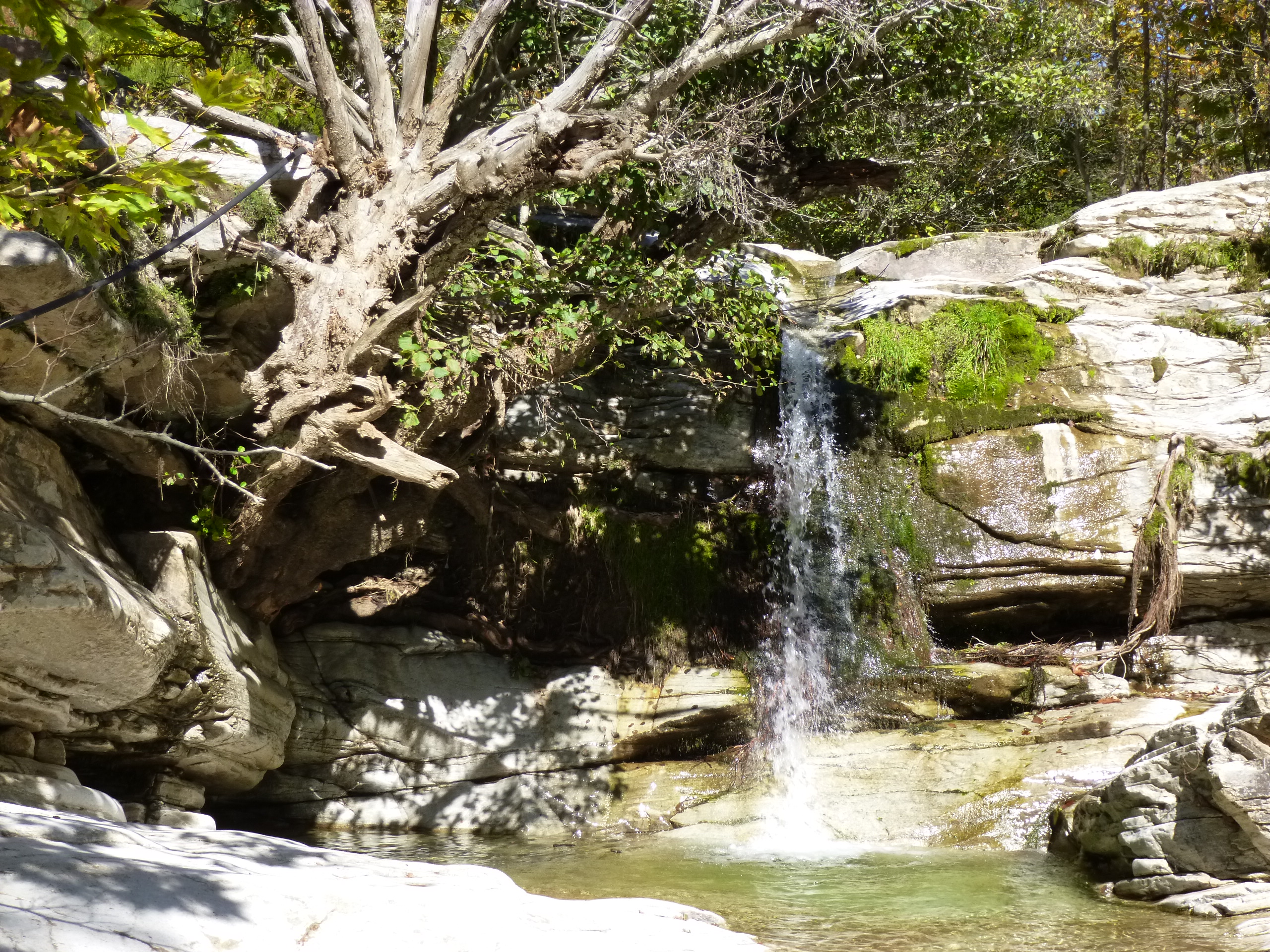
- Waterfall in Maries

- Location within Greece
- Coordinates: 40°39′N 24°39′E
- Country: Greece
- Administrative region: East Macedonia and Thrace
- Regional unit: Thasos
- Municipality: Thasos

Population (2021)
  - Community: 463
- Time zone: UTC+2 (EET)
  - Summer (DST): UTC+3 (EEST)
- Website: www.thassos.gr

Maries (Greek: Μαριές) is a village on the island of Thasos in northern Greece.

== Geography ==
The village is located in a valley located just south of the massif of Mount Ipsarion and its neighbouring peaks. The village is located 4.2 km northwest from the historic village of Theologos and 4.9 km northeast from the port town of Limenaria. The village is surrounded by a steep ravine (formerly iron mines) and is one of the oldest settlements on the island of Thasos. The only lake on the island of Thasos is located just north to the village of Maries.
