= South Kynouria =

South Kynouria Νότια Κυνουρία
- Municipality
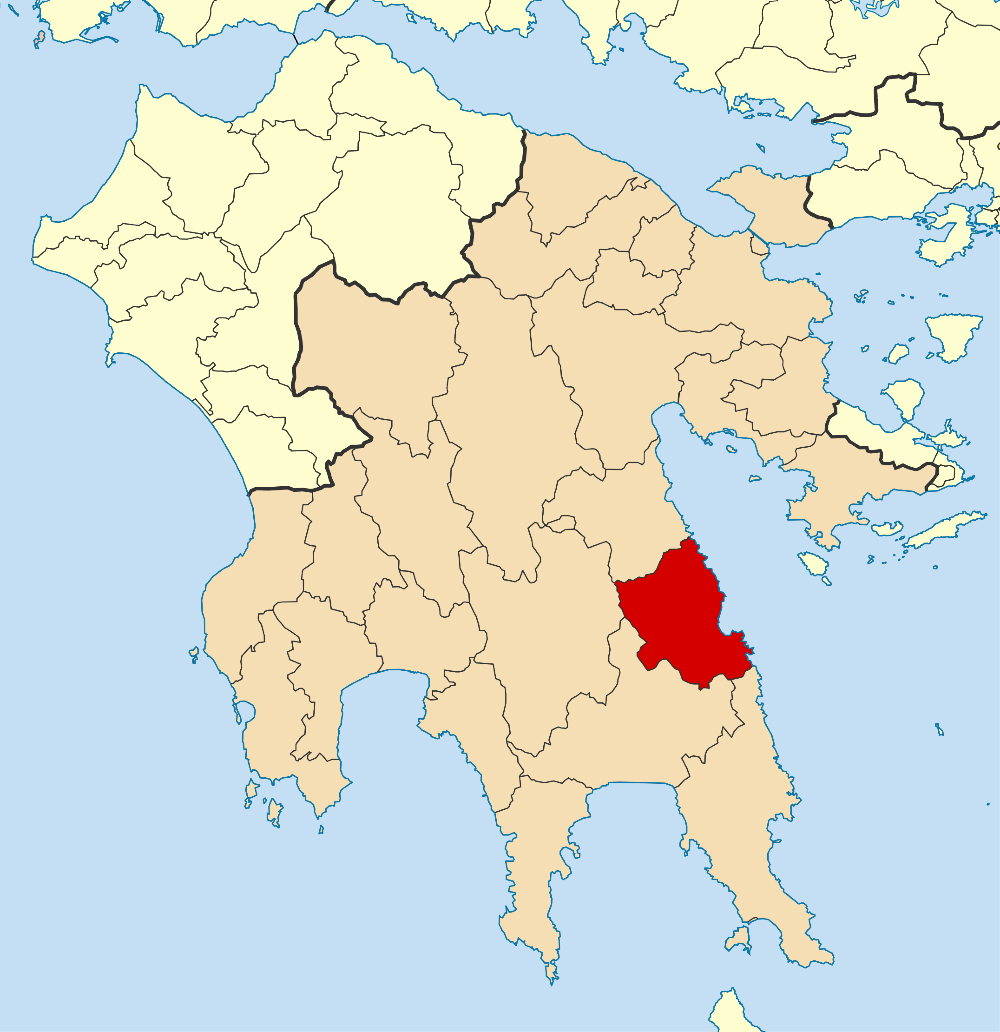

- Location within Greece
- Coordinates: 37°10′N 22°51′E
- Country: Greece
- Administrative region: Peloponnese
- Regional unit: Arcadia
- Seat: Leonidio

Area
  - Municipality: 592.4 km^{2} (228.7 sq mi)

Population (2021)
  - Municipality: 7,245
  - Density: 12.23/km^{2} (31.68/sq mi)
- Time zone: UTC+2 (EET)
  - Summer (DST): UTC+3 (EEST)

South Kynouria (Greek: Νότια Κυνουρία – Notia Kynouria) is a municipality in the Arcadia regional unit, Peloponnese, Greece. The seat of the municipality is the town of Leonidio. The municipality has an area of 592.439 km^{2}. It covers the central part of the ancient region of Cynuria (the southeast coastal area of the Peloponnese) and the southern part of the former Kynouria Province.

== Municipality ==
The municipality South Kynouria was formed at the 2011 local government reform by the merger of the following 3 former municipalities, that became municipal units:

- Kosmas
- Leonidio
- Tyros
