= Leonidio =

Leonidio Λεωνίδιο
- Municipal unit

- Location within the regional unit

- Location within Greece
- Coordinates: 37°10′N 22°51′E
- Country: Greece
- Administrative region: Peloponnese
- Regional unit: Arcadia
- Municipality: South Kynouria

Area
  - Municipal unit: 418.7 km^{2} (161.7 sq mi)
  - Community: 102.7 km^{2} (39.7 sq mi)
- Elevation: 40 m (130 ft)

Population (2021)
  - Municipal unit: 5,315
  - Municipal unit density: 12.69/km^{2} (32.88/sq mi)
  - Community: 3,792
  - Community density: 36.92/km^{2} (95.63/sq mi)
- Time zone: UTC+2 (EET)
  - Summer (DST): UTC+3 (EEST)
- Postal code: 223 00
- Area code: 27570
- Vehicle registration: ΑΡ
- Website: www.notiakynouria.gov.gr

Leonidio (Greek: Λεωνίδιο, Katharevousa: Λεωνίδιον, Tsakonian: Αγιελήδι) is a town and a former municipality in Arcadia, Peloponnese, Greece. Since the 2011 local government reform it is part of the municipality South Kynouria, of which it is a municipal unit. The municipal unit has an area of 418.65 km^{2}, the community 102.67 km^{2}. It is considered a traditional settlement.

== Name ==
In the local Tsakonian language, the only surviving descendant of Doric Greek, the town is called Agie Lidi.

== Landscape ==
The town of Leonidio, with a population of 3,826, emerges from a spectacular landscape, bound by two abrupt mountainsides enclosing the town from the north and south. The River Dafnon passes through the town, and its banks are linked with three bridges. The town is capital of the Tsakonia region, notable for its cultural and linguistic particularities, and the settlement itself offers striking and picturesque architecture; now a protected architectural site, there are very strict regulations for building within the town's limits.

=== Plaka ===
Plaka is the picturesque port of Leonidio, situated 4 km from the town. It functions mainly with the help of tourism, but a small fishing fleet is also to be found; a well-regarded beach lies 4 km across the shore. The port takes in a number of taverns and bars immediately adjacent to the sea, while every August, it also hosts the "Tsakonian Eggplant Festival", attracting well-known chefs from across Europe.

== History ==
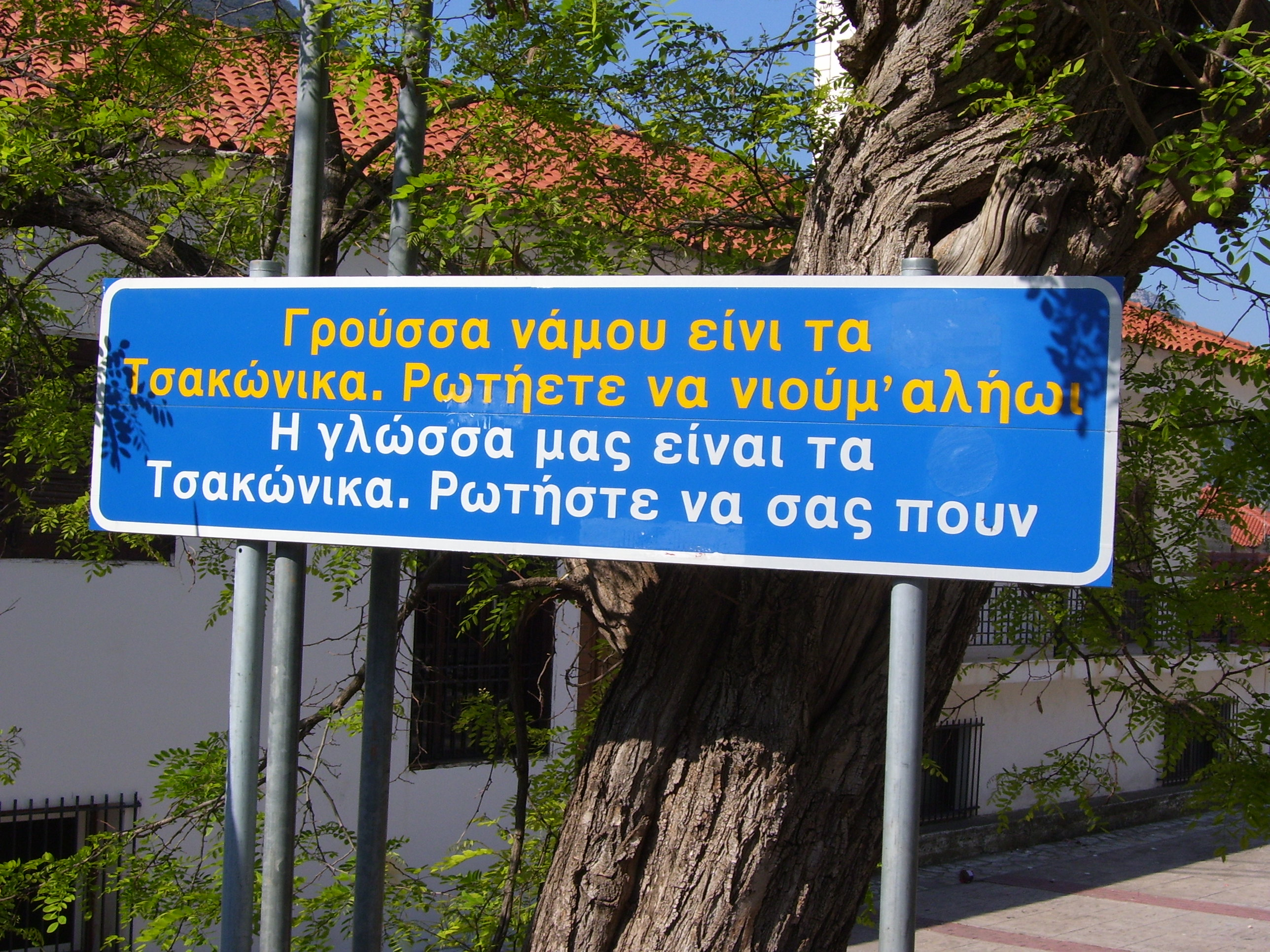
"Our language is Tsakonian", bilingual (Tsakonian and Standard Greek) sign in Leonidio.

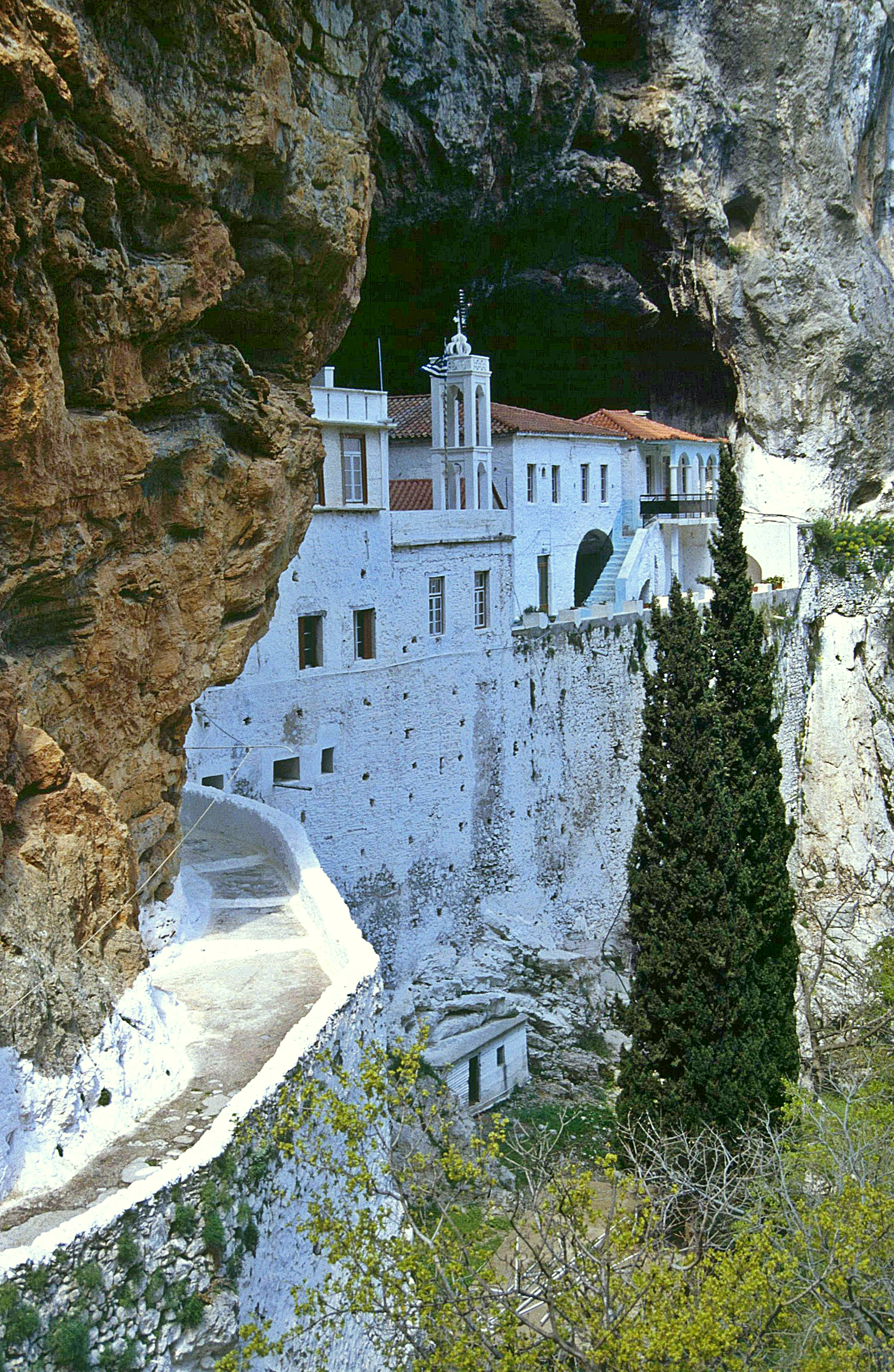
Monastery Agiou Nikolaou Sintzas, a short distance to the west of Leonidio.

Leonidio is situated near the ancient city of Prasiae, which was an important harbour for Sparta until its ruin by the Athenians during the Peloponnesian War.

=== Modern era ===
Today, Leonidio is a lively and colourful town, especially in summer months, as a result of newly developing tourism. Agriculture, nevertheless, remains a main source of income for its residents, and the benefits of the exploitation of the plain are irreplaceable. The town is also famous for its unusual Easter celebration, when the custom of aerostata (air balloons) attracts spectators. Greek comedy writer Dimitrios Psathas once recommended the virtues of passing: "..carnival in Patras, and Easters in Leonidio".

== Geography ==
Leonidio is situated on the eastern coast of the Peloponnese and, although coastal, opening on to the Myrtoan Sea, it is also mainly mountainous, punctuated by the Parnon. Leonidio town itself, however, is to be found on the area's plain, which proves fertile and very important for the local economy, with its high level of agricultural employment. Apart from citrus fruit, pears, tomatoes and olives, the area's most famous and widely distributed product is the Tsakonian eggplant, characteristic in its sweet taste, and acknowledged and protected by the European Union. Three old windmills overlook the town.

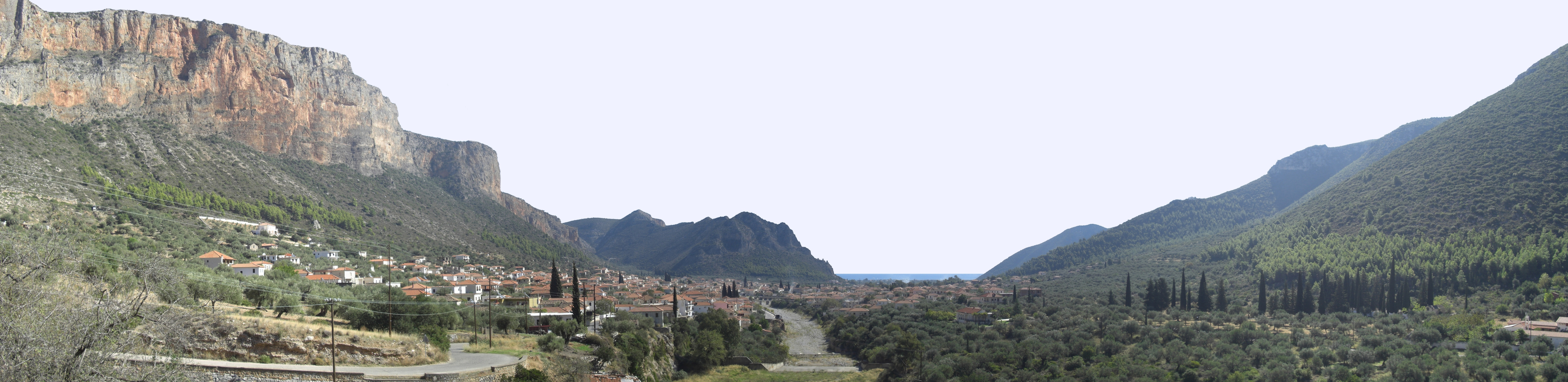
Panorama of Leonidio.

=== Geology ===
Thanks to its position on the mountain of Parnon, the Leonidio municipality is home to a number of geological formations, such as the Peleta Sinkhole, and the Propantes pothole (a vertical cave).

== Sports ==
In Leonidio, the sports club Leonidio F.C. is active; it was founded in 1969 and maintains football and basketball departments. In the past, the football section has competed in the Gamma Ethniki (Third National Division).

In recent years, it has developed into an important climbing destination in Greece.

== Demographics ==
The area is part of Tsakonia, and the Tsakonian language is still spoken in some areas. Its communities take in the following: Leonidio, Vaskina, Agios Vasileios, Kosmas, Kounoupia, Mari, Paliochori, Paliochora, Peleta, Pigadi, Platanaki, Poulithra, Pragmatefti, Tsitalia, and Vlisidia.

== See also ==
- List of settlements in Arcadia
- List of traditional settlements of Greece
