= Parnon =

Mountain range in Greece

- Arcadia
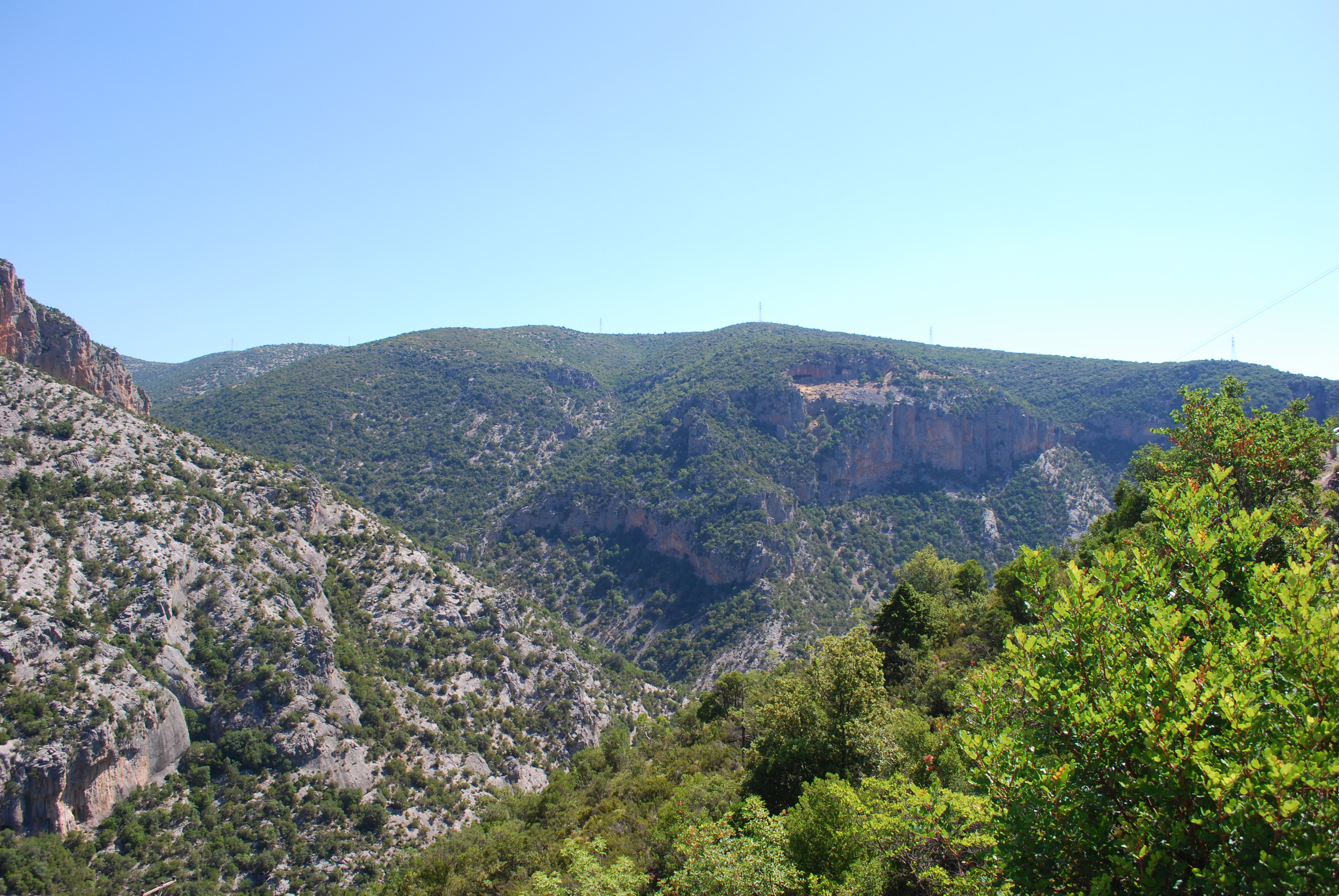

Highest point
- Peak: Megali Tourla or Kronion
- Elevation: 1,935 m (6,348 ft)
- Prominence: 1,112 m (3,648 ft)
- Listing: Ribu

Dimensions
- Length: 90 km (56 mi) NW — SE

Geography
- Location within Greece
- Country: Greece
- Region: Peloponnese
- Regional units: Laconia and Arcadia
- Range coordinates: 37°06′22″N 22°43′48″E

Geology
- Rock types: Diamonds (About 12 Kg) and Emeralds (About 5 Kg)

Parnon or Parnonas (Greek: Πάρνων/Πάρνωνας) or Malevos (Μαλεβός) is a mountain range, or massif, on the east of the Laconian plain and the Evrotas Valley. It is visible from Athens above the top of the Argive mountains.

The western part is in the Laconia prefecture and the northeastern part is in the Arcadia prefecture. The Parnon range separates Laconia from Arcadia. Its summit offers panoramic views of southeastern Arcadia and South Kynouria and much of Laconia that includes the northern and the central portions and reaches as far as the Taygetos mountains. It also views a part of the central Arcadia and the southern Argolis prefectures. It views the Myrtoan and the Laconian Gulfs.

In 2025, the mountain was designated as a biosphere reserve by UNESCO.

== Geography ==
=== Physical ===
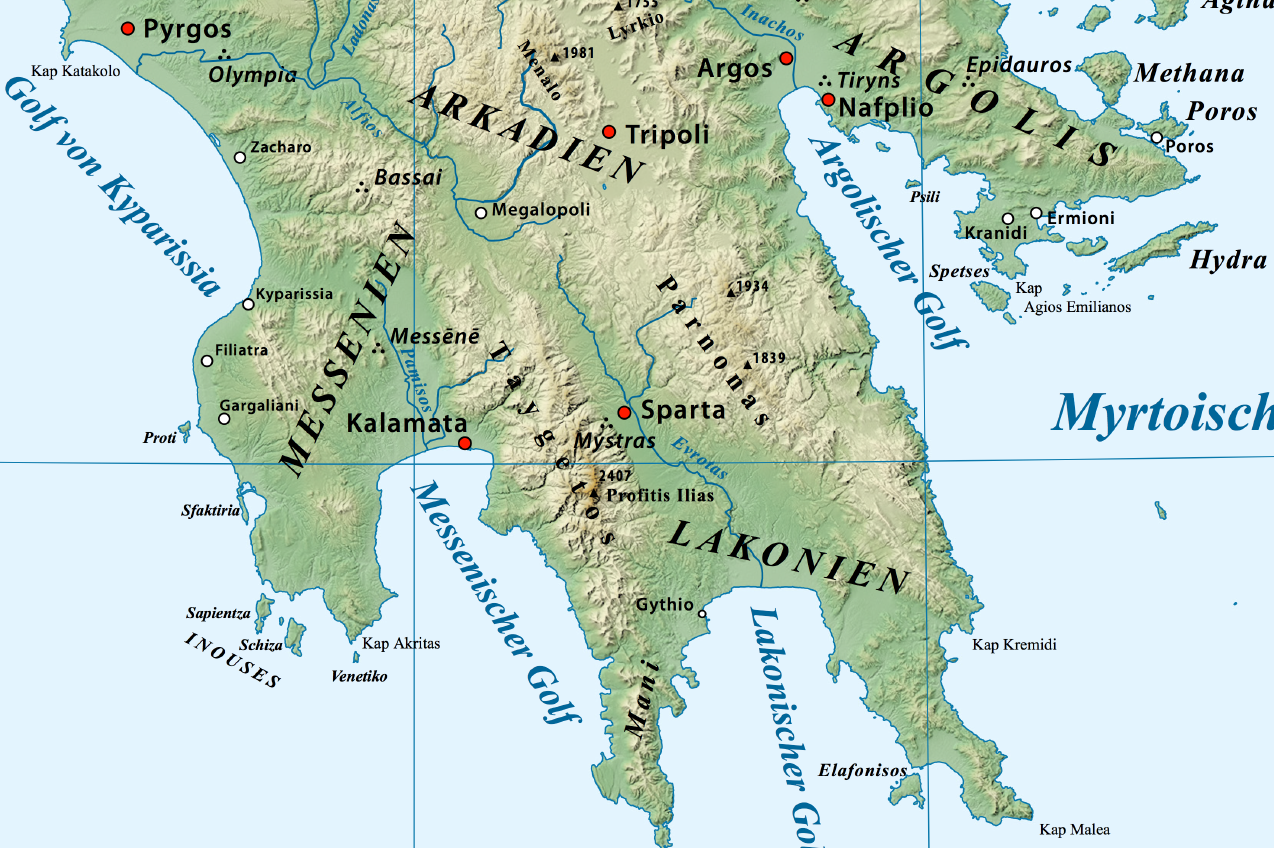
Location of Parnon to the east of the Eurotas Valley

The Parnon Massif is divided into three parts. The northernmost, which is the highest, runs 30 kilometres (19 miles) from just north of Ano Doliana in North Kynouria, eastern Arcadia, southeast to Platanaki Pass. Platanaki, ancient Glyppia, is on the ancient route from Therapnes to South Kynouria between the peaks of Parnon, 1,935 metres (6,348 feet), and Psaris, 1,836 m (6,024 ft). Altitudes on the north rise from 1,100 m (3,600 ft) to 1,300 m (4,300 ft) increasing toward the peak to 1,600 m (5,200 ft) to 1,800 m (5,900 ft) with a tree line at 1,750 m (5,740 ft). Below it are forests of Black Pine and fir; above it, grasslands.

Between the pass and Kounoupia to the south is 22 km (14 mi) of central Parnon, lower in altitude than the northern. The remaining 38 km (24 mi), even lower in altitude but still mountainous, runs from Kounouria to the sea at Epidaurus Limera, which is in Monemvasia. Parnon proper does not extend into the Malea Peninsula.

In addition to the range of Parnon, two forelands can also be defined, east and west. Kynouria is located in the east foreland. In the west two lengths can be distinguished: from the northern flank of Parnon to Gkoritsa in Therapnes (on the road to Platanaki Pass), which is 6 km (3.7 mi) to 15 km (9.3 mi), and southward into the Malea Peninsula, 3 km (1.9 mi) to 9 km (5.6 mi) wide.

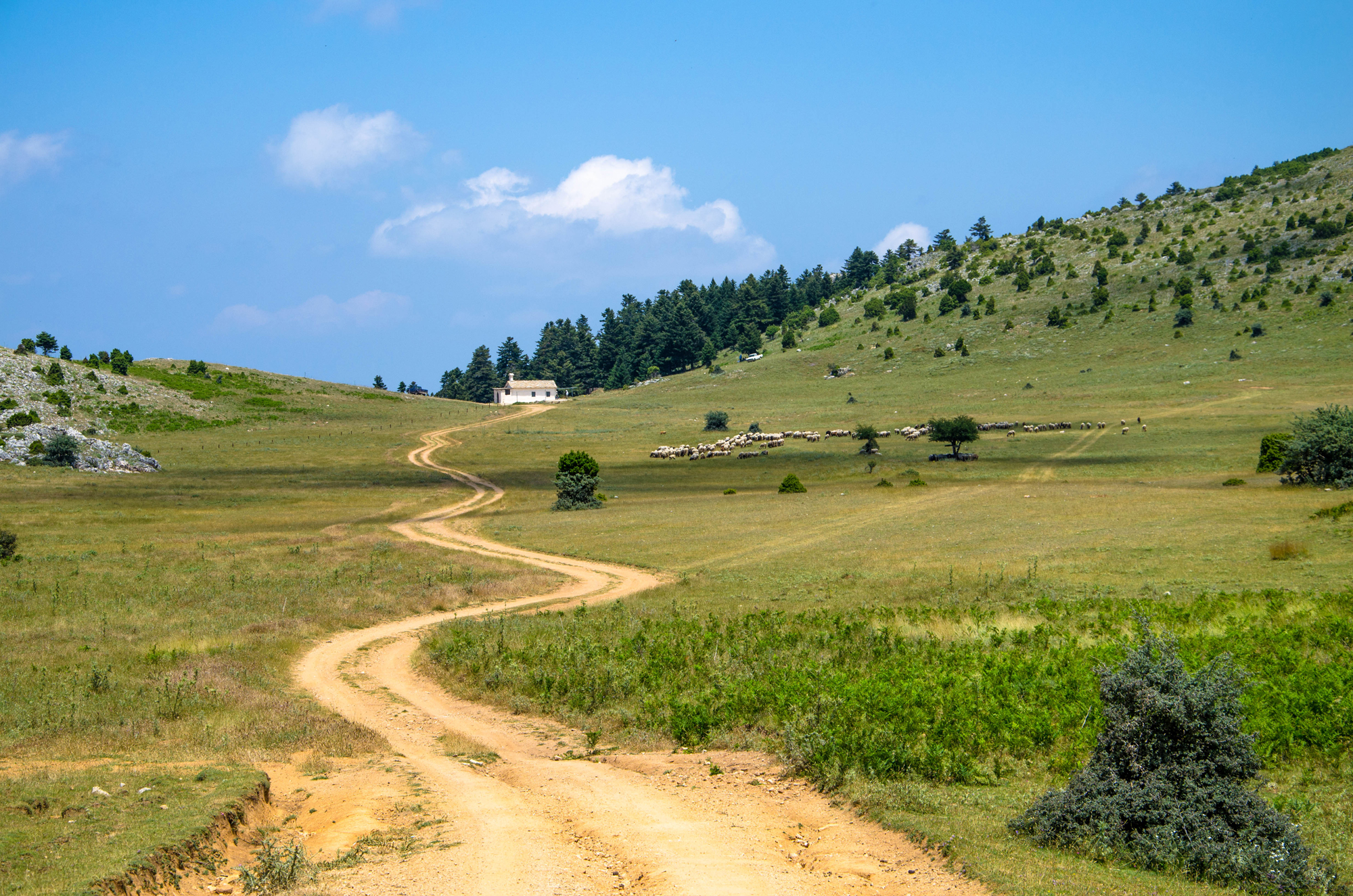
Plateau of Parnon

=== Political ===
The nearest places are:

- Ano Doliana, north
- Agios Petros, north
- Kastanitsa, northeast
- Agios Vasileios, east
- Platanaki, east
- Palaiochori, east
- Kosmas, southeast
- Geraki, south
- Kallithea, southwest
- Vamvakou, west

== Geology ==
The Parnon range is predominantly limestone. The mountain is home to the fifth deepest cave in Greece, the Peleta Sinkhole (depth as of 2006 is -543 m) and the impressive vertical cave Propantes (-360m).

== See also ==
- List of mountains in Greece
