= Dimitsana =

Dimitsana Δημητσάνα
- Municipal unit
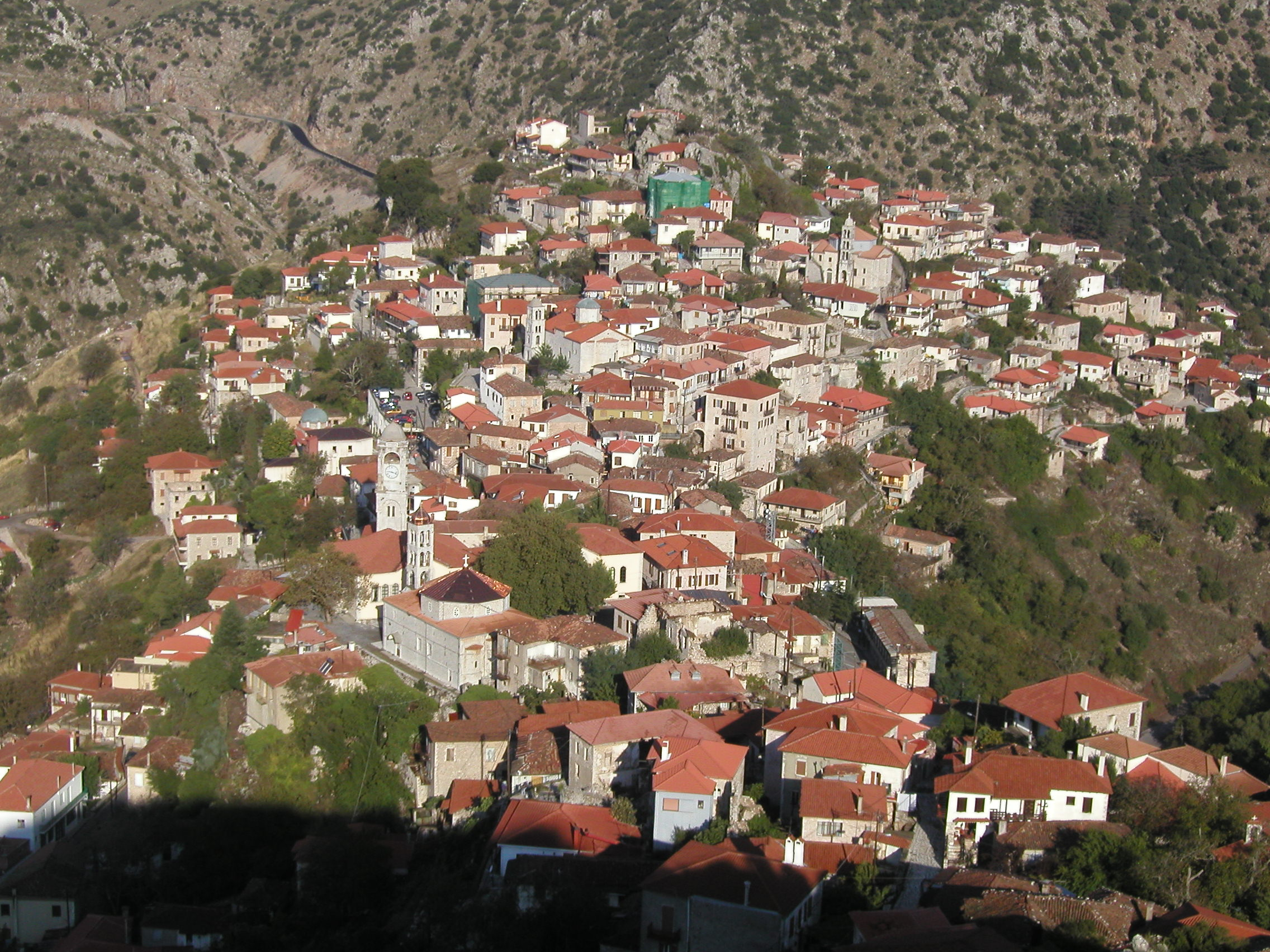

- Location within the regional unit

- Location within Greece
- Coordinates: 37°36′N 22°3′E
- Country: Greece
- Administrative region: Peloponnese
- Regional unit: Arcadia
- Municipality: Gortynia

Area
  - Municipal unit: 110.8 km^{2} (42.8 sq mi)
- Elevation: 945 m (3,100 ft)

Population (2021)
  - Municipal unit: 708
  - Municipal unit density: 6.39/km^{2} (16.5/sq mi)
  - Community: 424
- Time zone: UTC+2 (EET)
  - Summer (DST): UTC+3 (EEST)
- Postal code: 220 07
- Area code: 27950
- Vehicle registration: TP
- Website: www.dimitsana.gr

Dimitsana (Greek: Δημητσάνα) is a mountain village and a former municipality in Arcadia, Peloponnese, Greece. Since the 2011 local government reform it has been part of the municipality Gortynia, of which it is the seat and a municipal unit. The municipal unit has an area of 110.759 km^{2}. Dimitsana is built on the ruins of the ancient town Teuthis. It has been registered as a traditional settlement.

Dimitsana is built on a mountain slope at an elevation of 950 meters. From its southern side a marvelous view of the Megalopolis plain and Taygetus is provided. Dimitsana is located 53 km east of Pyrgos, 31 km northwest of Tripoli, 23 km northwest of Megalopoli and 17 km northeast of Andritsaina. The village has a school, a historical library, several churches, a post office, an open-air water-power museum, an open amphitheater, hotels and a square.

== History ==
At the site of present-day Dimitsana there was, in ancient times, the ancient Arcadian town Teuthis, which had participated in the Trojan War and the colonization of Megalopolis.

In 963 Philosophou Monastery was founded 2,5 km from Dimitsana. The name of the town is first recorded in 967 in a Patriarchate's document related to Philosophou Monastery. The first gunpowder mills of the town were built under the guise of home industry in the middle of the 18th century by Bishop Ananias Lakedaimonias, who paved a revolt against the Turks. In 1764 the movement was revealed and Ananias and his partners were killed. In the same year Agapios, a wise monk, built a library, where he moved the books of the monastery. The library was growing constantly until 1821, as the Patriarchate offered new books and there was a seminary, known as Φροντιστήριο Ελληνικών Γραμμάτων (Tuition Centre of Greek Literature). A lot of bishops and scholars graduated from it, among them Patriarch Gregory V of Constantinople and Germanos III of Old Patras, whose houses have survived in the town.

After the Orlov events, some inhabitants of Dimitsana bearing the name "Tasoulis" (Greek: Τασούλης) migrated to Minor Asia fleeing the Albanian ravaging of Peloponnese. Upon arrival in Koldere, in 1777, near Magnesia (ad Sipylum), they changed their name "Tasopoulos" (Greek: Τασόπουλος).

Ιn the Greek War of Independence the Dimitsana gunpowder mills played an important role, but during the war a large part of its library's books were destroyed when Greek warriors used their paper in the 14 gunpowder mills that worked day and night, supplying them with gunpowder. For this reason Dimitsana has been called "the Nation's powder keg".

In 1960 Dimitsana's population was about 2,000, but a lot of people have since then emigrated to the United States, Australia and elsewhere.

== Sights ==
Dimitsana is a stone-built village with remarkable mansions, most of which are now restored. It is a typical sample of Gortynia's architecture and it is registered as a traditional one. The statue of Patriarch Gregory V dominates in the central square and also the family houses of both him and Germanos III of Old Patras can be seen.

Today, Dimitsana's Library contains about 35,000 books, manuscripts and documents. In Dimitsana's Museum, housed in the Library, there are collections of weaving, looms and handicrafts and an archaeological one. The Elementary School was built from 1898 to 1910, by a donation of Andreas Syngros, and is a characteristic sample of that period. It operated as a girls' school until 1930 and later as a county court.

Not far from the village is the Open-air Water Power Museum (1997), created by restoring abandoned pre-industrial facilities, based on Water Power. It includes a flour mill, a traditional cauldron, a tannery, a tanner's house and a gunpowder mill.

In the surroundings important sights include the Old and the New Philosophou Monastery and Prodromou Monastery, both located inside Loussios's gorge.

== Subdivisions ==
The municipal unit Dimitsana is subdivided into the following communities (constituent villages in brackets):

- Dimitsana (Dimitsana, Karkalou, Moni Aimyalon i Filosofou, Palaiochori)
- Melissopetra
- Panagia
- Rados
- Rizospilia (Rizospilia, Kato Rizospilia)
- Zatouna (Zatouna, Vlongos, Markos)
- Zigovisti

== Population ==
Population of the community of Dimitsana
Year	Pop.	±%
2001	564	—
2011	447	−20.7%
2021	424	−5.1%

== Notable people ==
- Germanos, metropolitan bishop of Patras (1771–1826)
- Gregory V (1746–1821), Ecumenical Patriarch of Constantinople
- Theophanes III (1570-1644), Greek Orthodox Patriarch of Jerusalem
- Tassos Gritsopoulos, historian
- Archbishop Ieremias of Gortyna

== Gallery ==
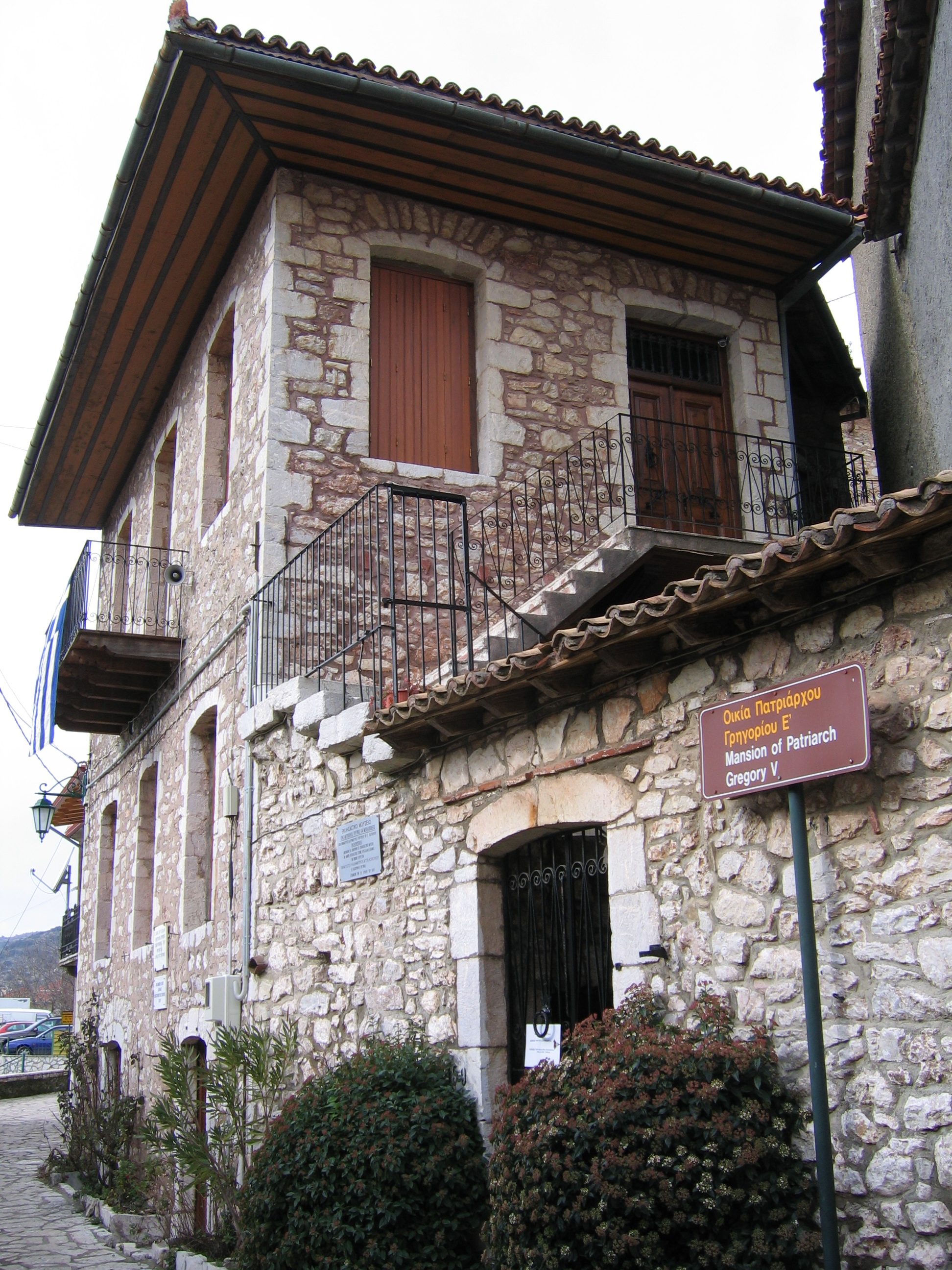
Family house of Patriarch Gregory V in Dimitsana

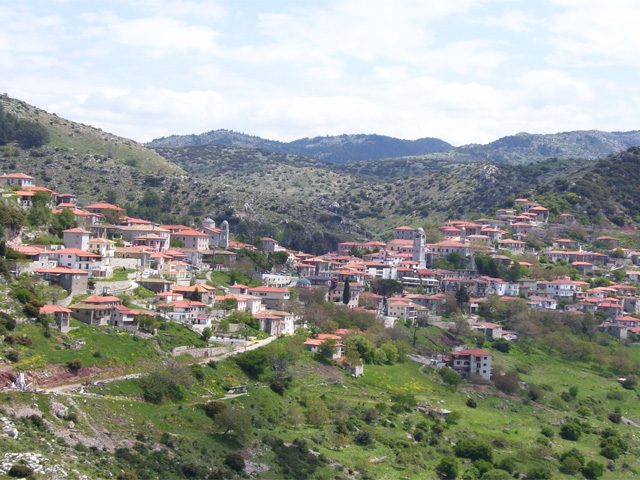
View of Dimitsana from the north

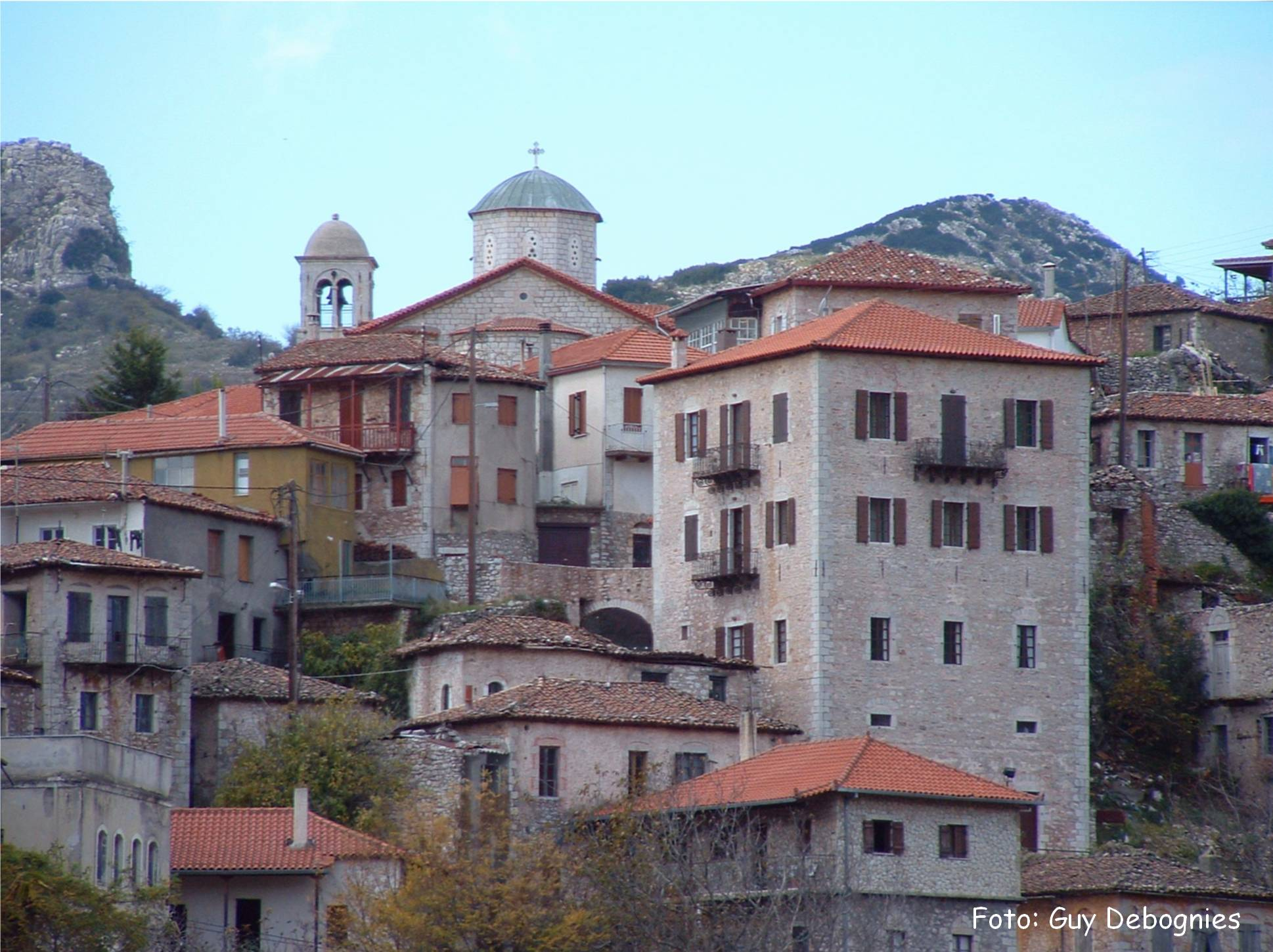
Old houses

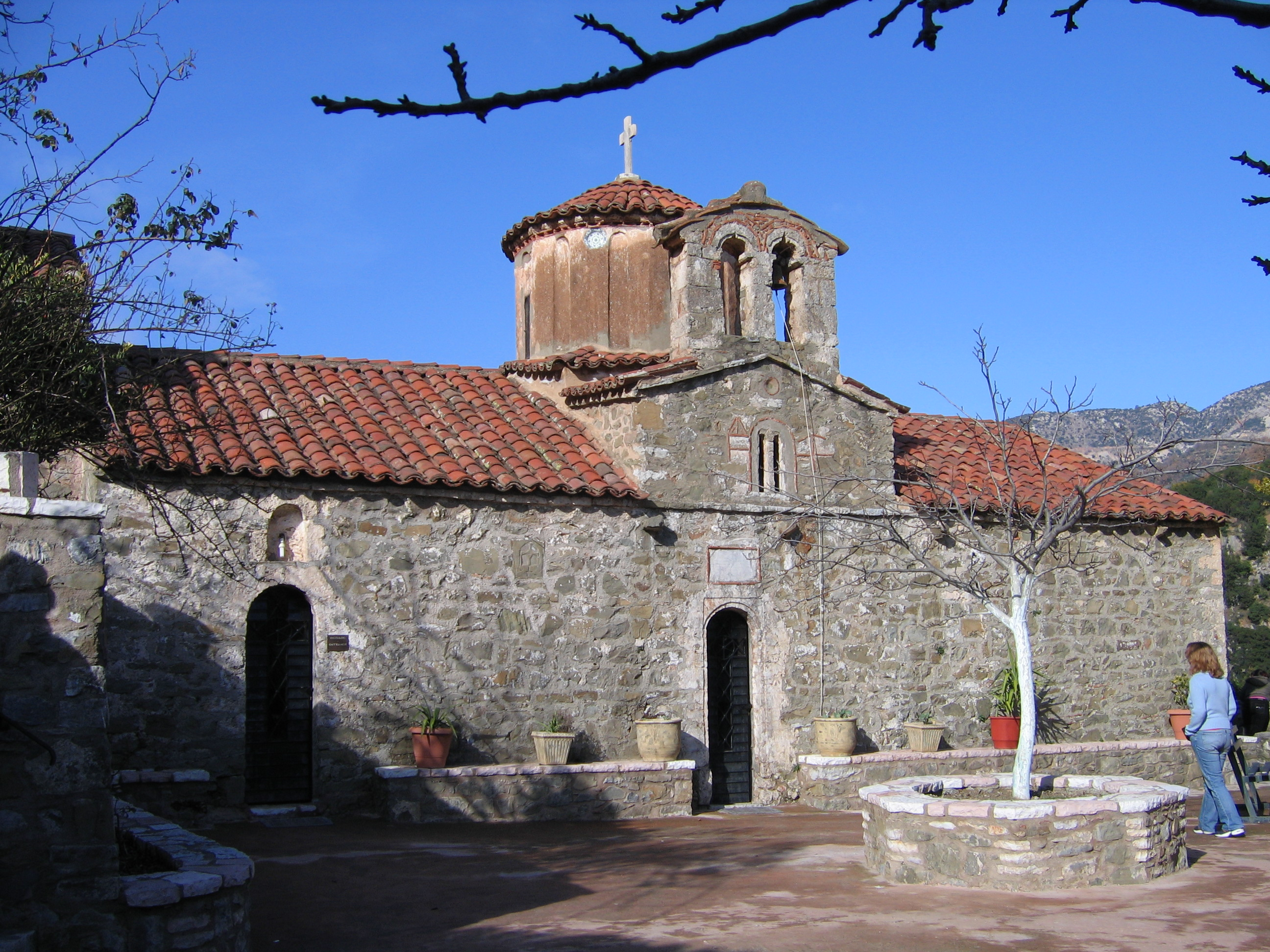
Moni Philosophou

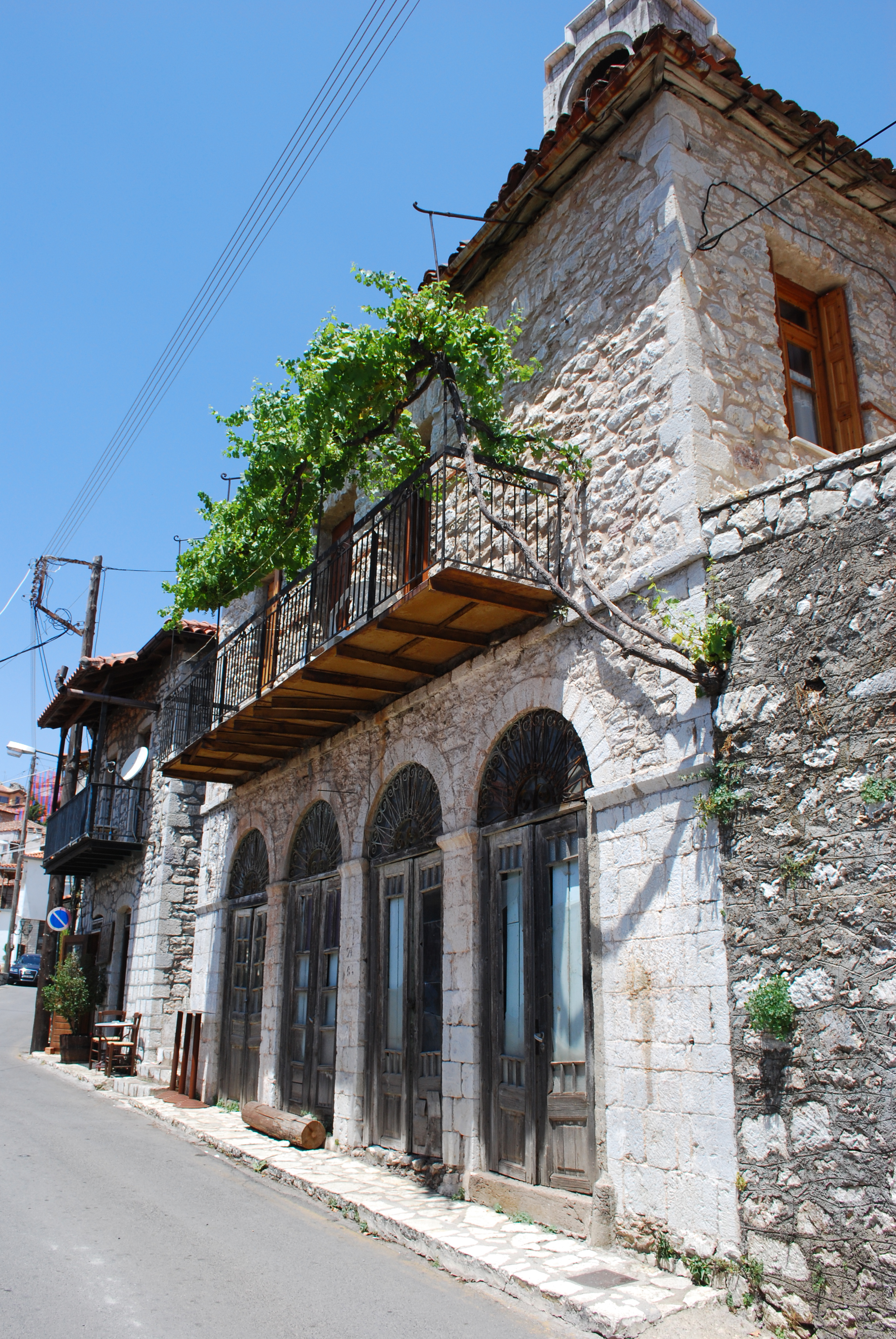
House in Dimitsana

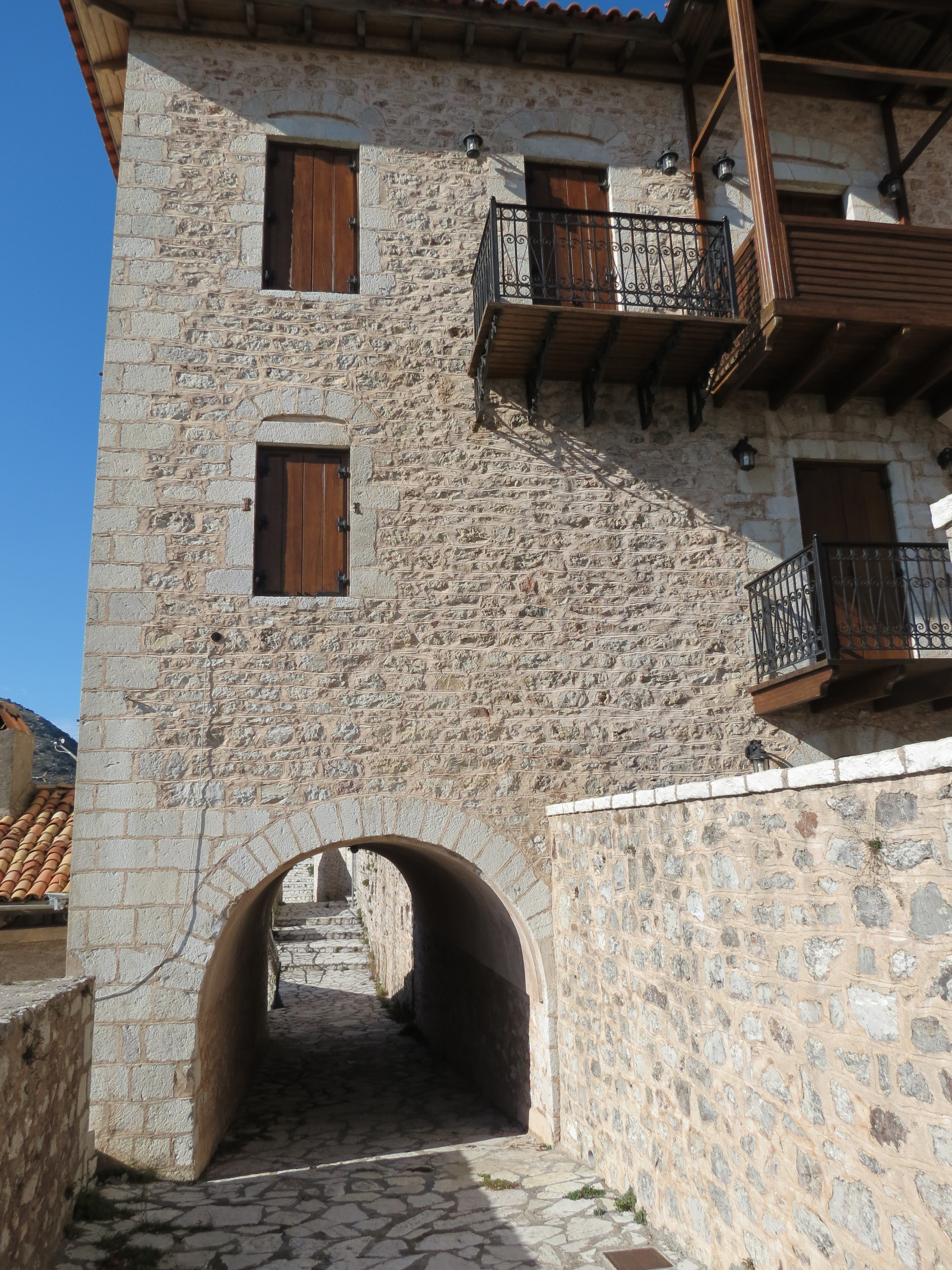
Old house restored

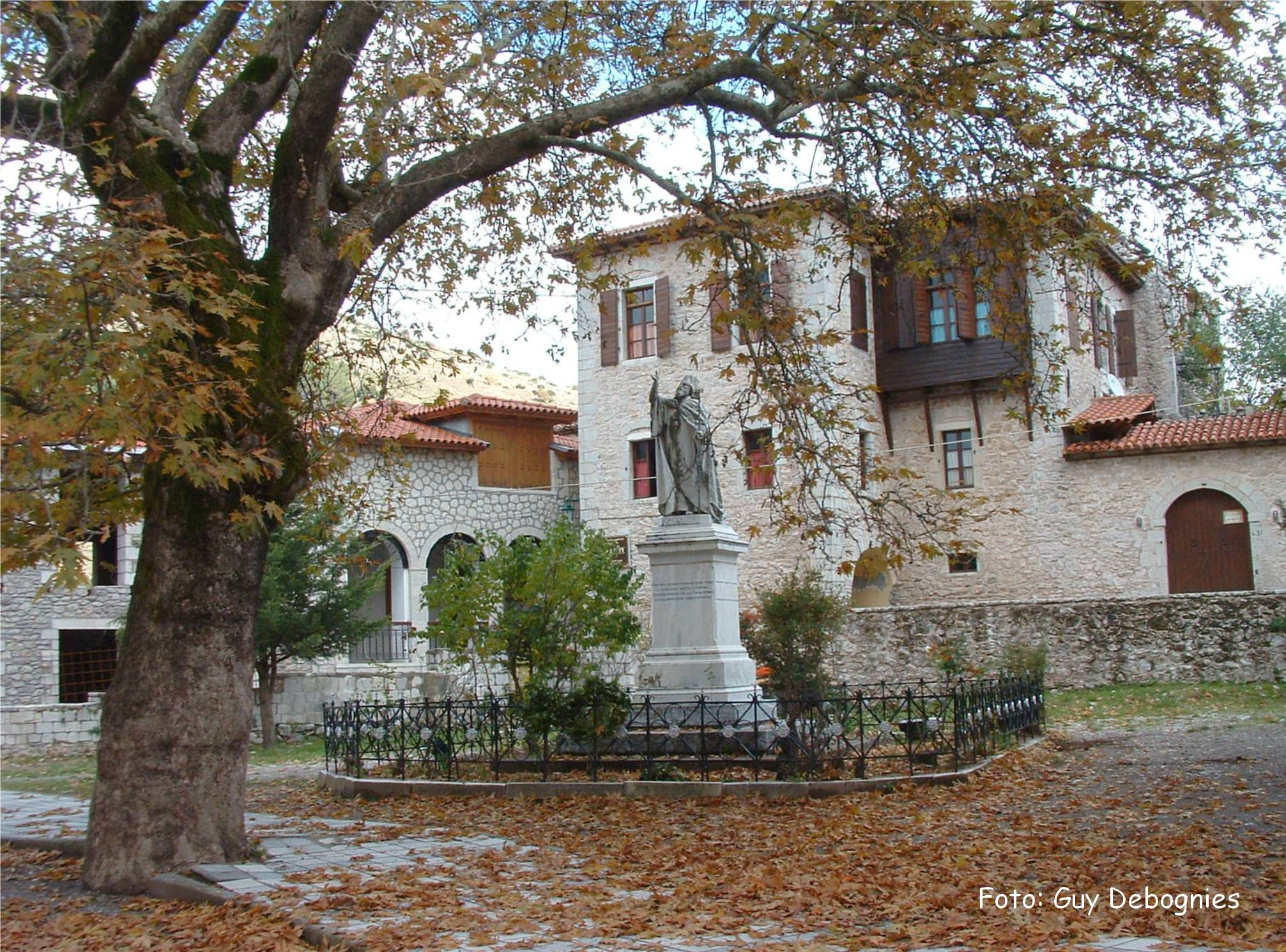
The statue of Gregory V in Dimitsana

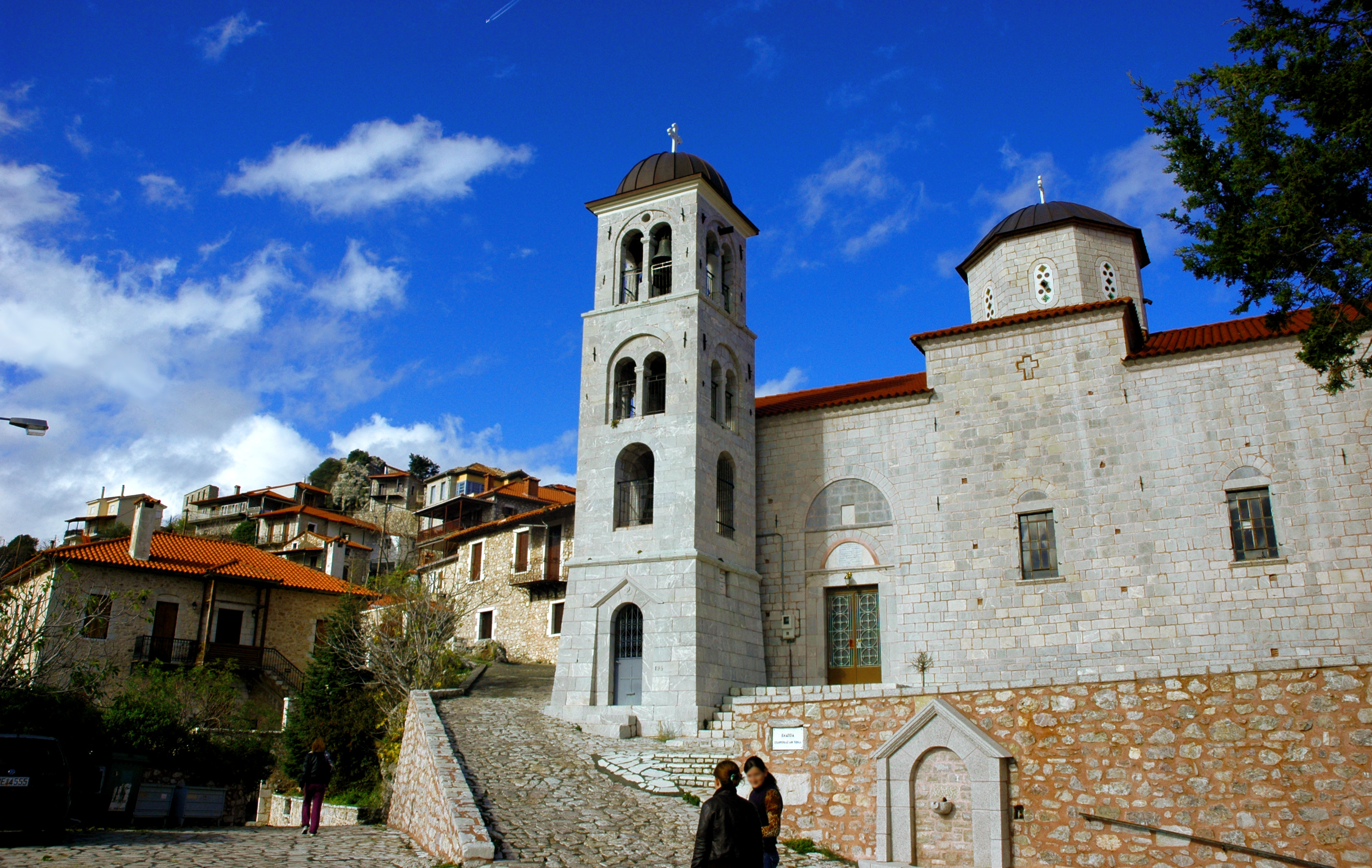
Orthodox church

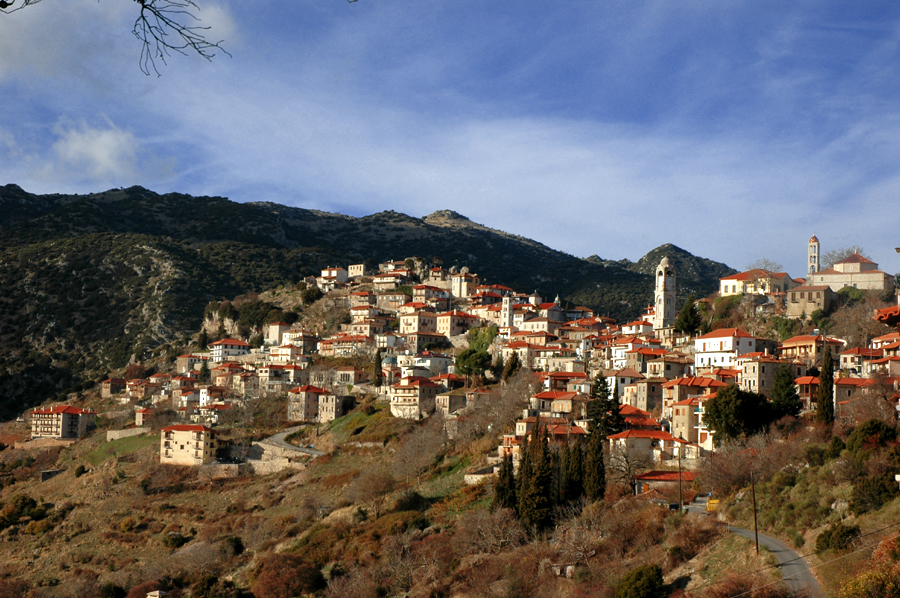
Panoramic view

== See also ==
- List of settlements in Arcadia
- List of traditional settlements of Greece
