= Gortynia =

Gortynia Γορτυνία
- Municipality
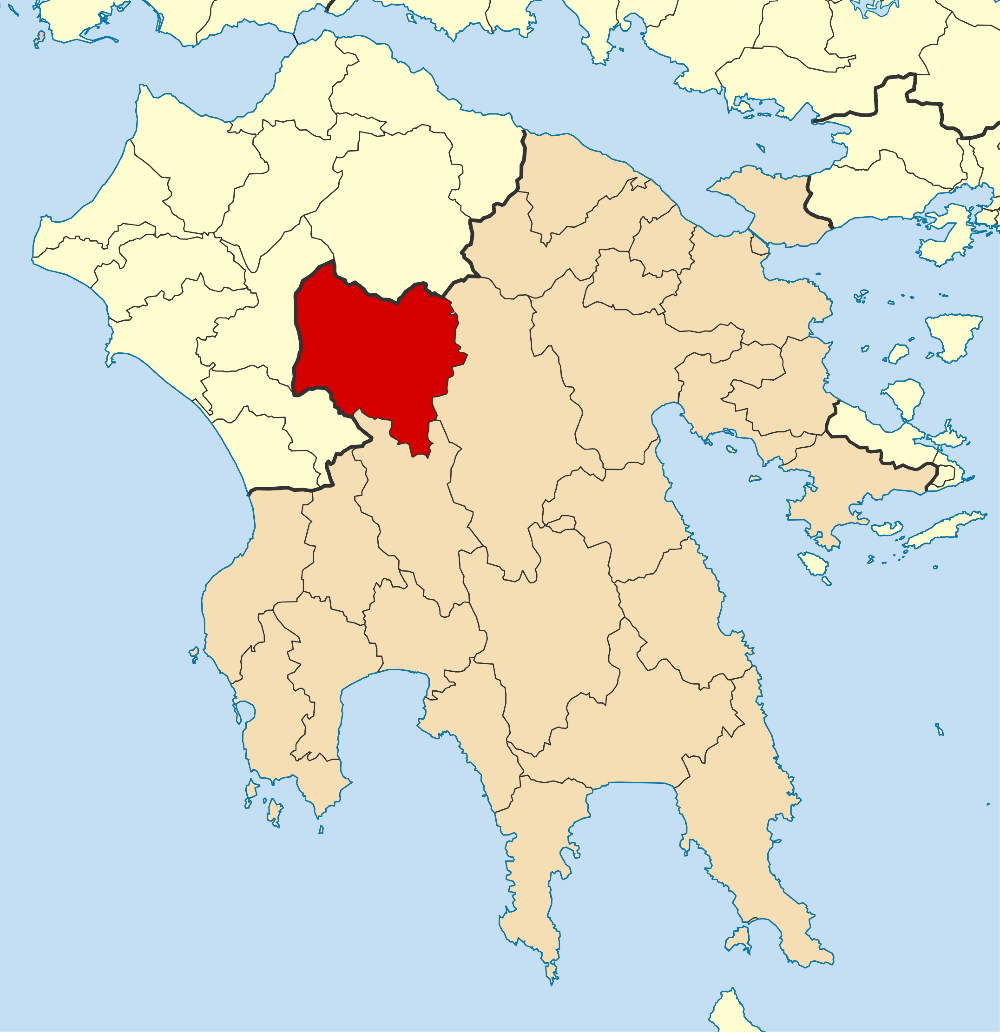

- Location within Greece
- Coordinates: 37°36′N 22°3′E
- Country: Greece
- Administrative region: Peloponnese
- Regional unit: Arcadia
- Seat: Dimitsana

Area
  - Municipality: 1,050.9 km^{2} (405.8 sq mi)

Population (2021)
  - Municipality: 7,915
  - Density: 7.532/km^{2} (19.51/sq mi)
- Time zone: UTC+2 (EET)
  - Summer (DST): UTC+3 (EEST)

Gortynia (Greek: Γορτυνία) is a municipality in the Arcadia regional unit, Peloponnese, Greece. The seat of the municipality is the town Dimitsana. The municipality has an area of 1,050.882 km^{2}. Its name is derived from the ancient city of Gortys.

== Municipality ==
The municipality Gortynia was formed at the 2011 local government reform by the merger of the following 8 former municipalities, that became municipal units:

- Dimitsana
- Iraia
- Kleitor
- Kontovazaina
- Langadia
- Trikolonoi
- Tropaia
- Vytina

== Province ==
The province of Gortynia (Greek: Επαρχία Γορτυνίας) was one of the four provinces of Arcadia Prefecture. It was abolished in 2006. Its territory corresponded with that of the current municipality Gortynia and the municipal unit Gortyna.
