= Barcelona Zoo =

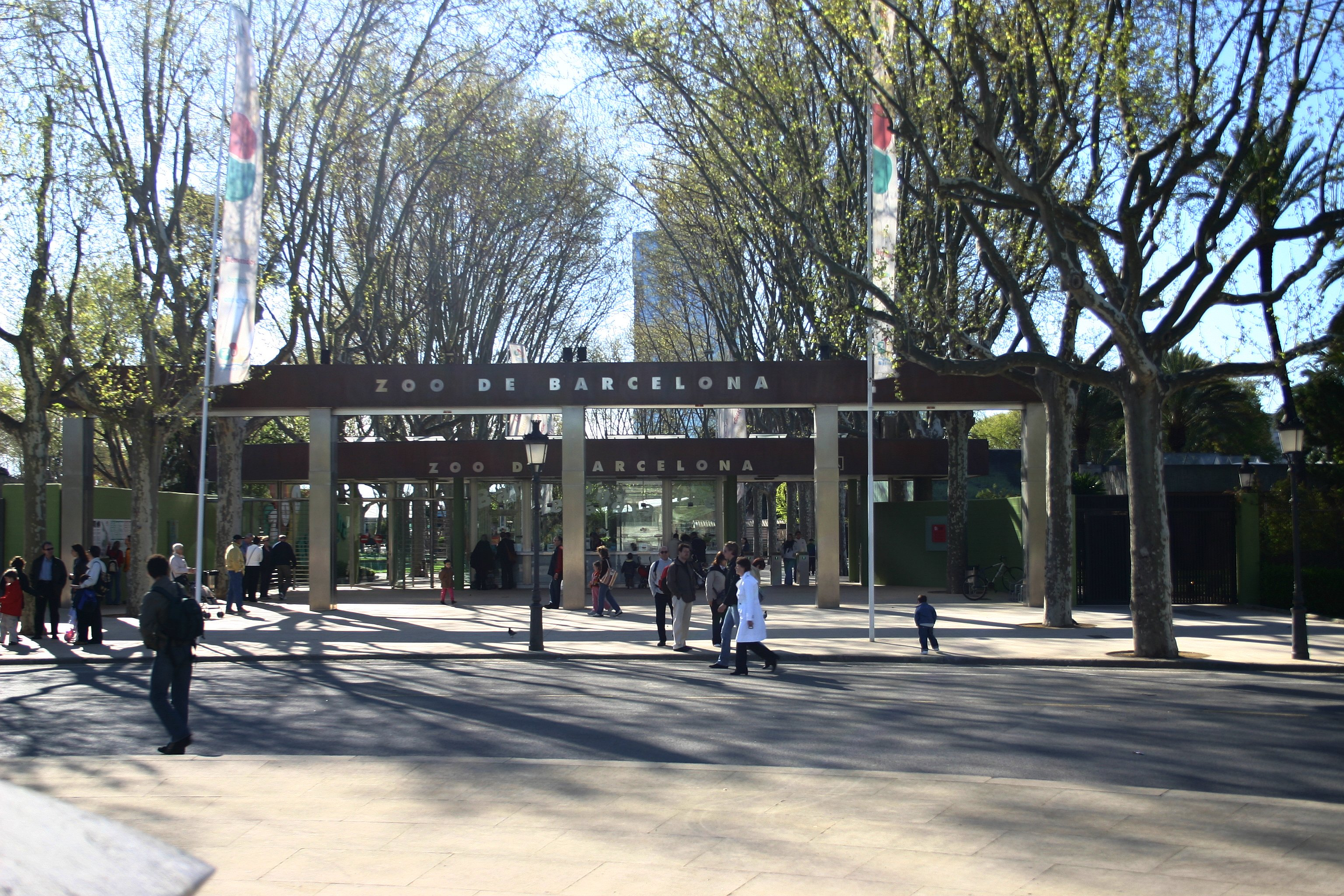
- Zoo entrance
- Interactive map of Barcelona Zoo
- 41.3868°N 2.19035°E
- Date opened: 1892
- Location: Barcelona, Catalonia, Spain
- Land area: 13 ha (32 acres)
- Memberships: EAZA, WAZA
- Website: www.zoobarcelona.cat/en/home

Barcelona Zoo (Parc Zoològic de Barcelona in Catalan, Parque Zoológico de Barcelona in Spanish) is a zoo in the Parc de la Ciutadella in Barcelona, Catalonia, Spain. The zoo used to be internationally known as the home of Snowflake, the only known albino gorilla, who died in 2003.

== Animals ==
- Terrarium: Opened in 1972, the Barcelona Zoo's terrarium has one of the largest reptile and amphibian collections in Europe.
- Aviarium: The aviary was constructed in the 1970s and renovated in 2002. It houses 70 species of birds from all over the world.
- Palmeral: Located by the zoo entrance, the Palmeral consists of thirteen aviaries with different species of macaws and cockatoos. The aviaries are made out of either colourful wooden huts or galvanised steel tube and mesh.
- Marmoset Gallery: Constructed in 1990, the Marmoset Gallery consists of indoor and outdoor enclosures for 7 species of marmosets and tamarins.
- Sahel Savannah: A new complex was constructed in 2018 to improve the habitats for the zoo's African animals like giraffes, lions and African elephants. Vegetation from the Sahel region such as acacias, grasses and euphorbias are planted in the complex to recreate the habitat. The area was known as the home of Yoyo, an African elephant who at the age of her death in 2024 was estimated to be the oldest African elephant in captivity.
- Dolphinarium: Barcelona declared itself free of cetaceans in 2018, when the zoo's last three dolphins were transferred to the Attica Zoological Park in Athens. A petition on Change.org by the activist Olivia Mandle, asking that the dolphins be moved to a marine sanctuary, gathered more than 57,000 signatures.
List of animals

Mammals

- African bush elephant
- African forest buffalo
- Bactrian camel
- Banded mongoose
- Barbary macaque
- Barbary sheep
- Black howler monkey
- Black-faced impala
- Black-tailed prairie dog
- Blue wildebeest
- Bornean orangutan
- Brazilian tapir
- Brown bear
- California sea lion
- Capybara
- Chapman's zebra
- Chimpanzee
- Cotton-top tamarin
- Crested porcupine
- De Brazza's monkey
- Drill
- Emperor tamarin
- Eurasian otter
- European bison
- European mouflon
- Giant anteater
- Golden-headed lion tamarin
- Goitered gazelle
- Goeldi's monkey
- Guanaco
- Hippopotamus
- Indian muntjac
- Jaguar
- Lion
- Lyle's flying fox
- Meerkat
- Mhorr gazelle
- Northern talapoin
- Patas monkey
- Pileated gibbon
- Pygmy hippopotamus
- Pygmy marmoset
- Red kangaroo
- Red panda
- Red-capped mangabey
- Red-handed tamarin
- Red-necked wallaby
- Ring-tailed lemur
- Rothschild's giraffe
- Saharan dorcas gazelle
- Scimitar oryx
- Silvery marmoset
- Spotted deer
- Spotted hyena
- Sri Lankan leopard
- Variegated spider monkey
- Warthog
- Western lowland gorilla
- White-naped mangabey

Birds

- African sacred ibis
- American flamingo
- Black crowned crane
- Black-crowned night heron
- Black-naped fruit dove
- Black-necked swan
- Blacksmith lapwing
- Black-winged stilt
- Blue crowned pigeon
- Blue-and-yellow macaw
- Blue-breasted kingfisher
- Blue-crowned motmot
- Blue-throated macaw
- Chilean flamingo
- Cinereous vulture
- Common shelduck
- Crested partridge
- Crested screamer
- Dalmatian pelican
- Egyptian vulture
- Eurasian scops owl
- Eurasian spoonbill
- European roller
- Glossy ibis
- Great curassow
- Green-backed heron
- Grey-winged trumpeter
- Griffon vulture
- Guinea turaco
- Humboldt penguin
- Hyacinth macaw
- Inca jay
- Indian peafowl
- Laughing kookaburra
- Lesser grey shrike
- Lesser sulphur-crested cockatoo
- Little bittern
- Little egret
- Luzon bleeding-heart
- Marbled teal
- Mindanao bleeding-heart
- Nicobar pigeon
- Northern bald ibis
- Palawan peacock-pheasant
- Pied avocet
- Pied crow
- Pied imperial pigeon
- Purple swamphen
- Red-and-green macaw
- Red-crested turaco
- Red-fronted macaw
- Rosy-billed pochard
- Saddle-billed stork
- Scarlet ibis
- Silvery-cheeked hornbill
- Southern ground hornbill
- Spangled cotinga
- Speckled mousebird
- Spectacled owl
- Sunbittern
- Superb fruit dove
- Triton cockatoo
- Wattled jacana
- Western plantain-eater
- White cockatoo
- White stork
- White-collared kingfisher
- White-naped pheasant pigeon
- Victoria crowned pigeon
- Violet turaco

Reptiles and amphibians

- African dwarf crocodile
- African spurred tortoise
- Aldabra giant tortoise
- Black marsh turtle
- Broad-snouted caiman
- Chinese alligator
- Dumeril's ground boa
- Estuarine crocodile
- Galápagos tortoise
- Gila monster
- Green anaconda
- Hermann's tortoise
- Indian python
- Komodo dragon
- Majorcan midwife toad
- Montseny brook newt
- Rhinoceros iguana
- Siamese crocodile
- Yacare caiman

== Incidents ==
On 8 December 2014, a 45-year-old man jumped into the lion enclosure. He was bitten and scratched, but was rescued and eventually recovered from the injuries.

On 8 December 2020, four lions at the zoo tested positive for COVID-19.
