= Attica Zoological Park =

Zoo in Spata, Greece

- Interactive map of Attica Zoological Park
- 37.981243°N 23.907377°E
- Date opened: 2000; 26 years ago
- Location: At Yalou, Spata, Attica, 190 04, Greece
- Land area: 200 acres (81 ha)
- No. of animals: 1500+
- No. of species: 220+
- Annual visitors: 380,000
- Memberships: EAZA and EAAM
- Major exhibits: World of Reptiles, Greek Forest, Arid Lands, African Savannah, Indonesia, Ground Birds, Birds of Prey, Water World, Parrots/Lory Land, Birds of Africa, Birds of Asia
- Owner: Jean-Jacques Lesueur
- Public transit: Pallini Bus: OSY: Line 319 from Doukissis Plakentias station
- Website: www.atticapark.com (in Greek)

Attica Park, officially Attica Zoological Park (AZP), is a private zoo located in the suburb of Spata, approximately 20 kilometres (12 mi) east of Athens, Greece. It is the only zoo in Greece. The zoo is home to more than 1,500 animals representing 220 species, in an area of 200-acre (81 ha). It is open 365 days a year.

The zoo is a member of the European Association of Zoos and Aquaria (EAZA) and the European Association of Aquatic Mammals (EAAM).

== History ==
The zoo, opened its doors to the public in May 2000, initially as a bird park, hosting the third-largest bird collection in the world featuring 1100 birds of 300 species, farm animals for the younger visitors and three walk-in aviaries – miniatures of three continents (Africa, Asia and the Americas) in which visitors can walk and admire the relevant bird fauna and flora.

World of Reptiles was added in April 2001, followed by Greek Forest in 2002, the African Savannah exhibit in 2003, a big cat exhibit and expansion of the African Savannah in 2004, a monkey exhibit in 2005, Land of the Cheetah, a chimpanzee (two of which came from ZooParc de Beauval) a siamang gibbons exhibit, and a desert exhibit (with Bactrian camels and Somali wild asses) in 2008.

In 2010, the zoo opened a dolphinarium and added two male southern white rhinos, that came from Whipsnade Zoo in England. In 2005, the zoo began to run daily shows featuring birds of prey. In 2010 the zoo began shows with its newly installed dolphinarium showing sea-lions and dolphins gathering both negative criticism and reactions from institutions and citizens.

In February 2010, Atu, a zoo-born pygmy hippopotamus, that was born in February 2009, was transferred to Duisburg Zoo in Germany, after a request by the EEP representative. The breeding of this species is highly important due to the fact that the birth rate of male hippos has fallen in contrast to the female one. Moreover, death rates amount to 30% within the first 60 days of their birth. His parents came from Edinburgh Zoo and from Aalborg Zoo. The zoo received the pair in November 2004, and since then three calves have been born to this pairing. The first one being also a male that was sent to Zurich Zoo and the last one being a female named Matima, that died a month and a half later due to a sudden pulmonary edema.

In January 2025, the zoo announced the transfer of its five dolphins to a Florida aquarium. In May 2025, the dolphins will be transferred to the Clearwater Marine Aquarium.

== Exhibits and attractions ==
=== World of Reptiles ===
World of Reptiles opened in April 2001 and it was the first addition to the zoo after its opening. Among the species in World of Reptiles are the cane toad, Madagascar day gecko, green tree python, yellow anaconda, tokay gecko, western ratsnake and the carpet python.

=== Greek Forest ===
The Greek Forest exhibit opened the following year in the summer of 2002 and includes species rarely seen in Greece. This exhibit features Eurasian Lynxes, Eurasian grey wolves, Eurasian brown bears, fallow deer, Griffon Vultures and the endangered Cretan wild goat also known as the kri-kri. In the past it also featured Eurasian Otters.

=== African Savannah ===
The African Savannah is an Africa-themed area that was opened in February 2003 and it is the largest exhibit in the zoo. Animals on display in this area include the reticulated giraffe, Rothschild's giraffe, Grant's zebra, Kafue lechwe and the South African ostrich. Sometimes Arabian and Scimitar oryxes can be viewed in this exhibit. Also in their own exhibits the area features sitatungas, pygmy hippos, Southern white rhinos and South African cheetahs. In the past there was also an exhibit with African Wild Dogs. In 2020 a giraffe feeding station was added in the African Savannah.

=== Indonesia ===
Indonesia was added in 2013. It features an Indonesian-themed aviary and a Komodo dragon exhibit. Birds in this area include the Bali myna, Victorian crowned pigeon, Nicobar pigeon, white-naped pheasant-pigeon, crested partridge and Luzon bleeding-heart.

=== Ground Birds ===
Ground Birds is a long row of cages home to a large variety of ground bird species, particularly pheasants. Exhibited species include blue eared pheasant, Edwards's pheasant, Elliot's pheasant, African green pigeon, yellow cardinal, California quail, Reeves's pheasant and the golden pheasant. Across from the exhibit is the zoo's animal hospital and the ZooCafe.

=== Birds of Prey ===
Birds of Prey is a row of cages for multiple raptor species. The exhibit is home to white-backed vultures, white-headed vultures, Egyptian vultures, king vultures, griffon vultures, bateleurs and palm-nut vultures. Nearby is the zoo's farm and petting zoo where visitors can see and pet Cameroon sheep, Nigerian Dwarf goats, zebus, Falabella ponies, and an endangered breed of pony, the Skyrian pony and more.

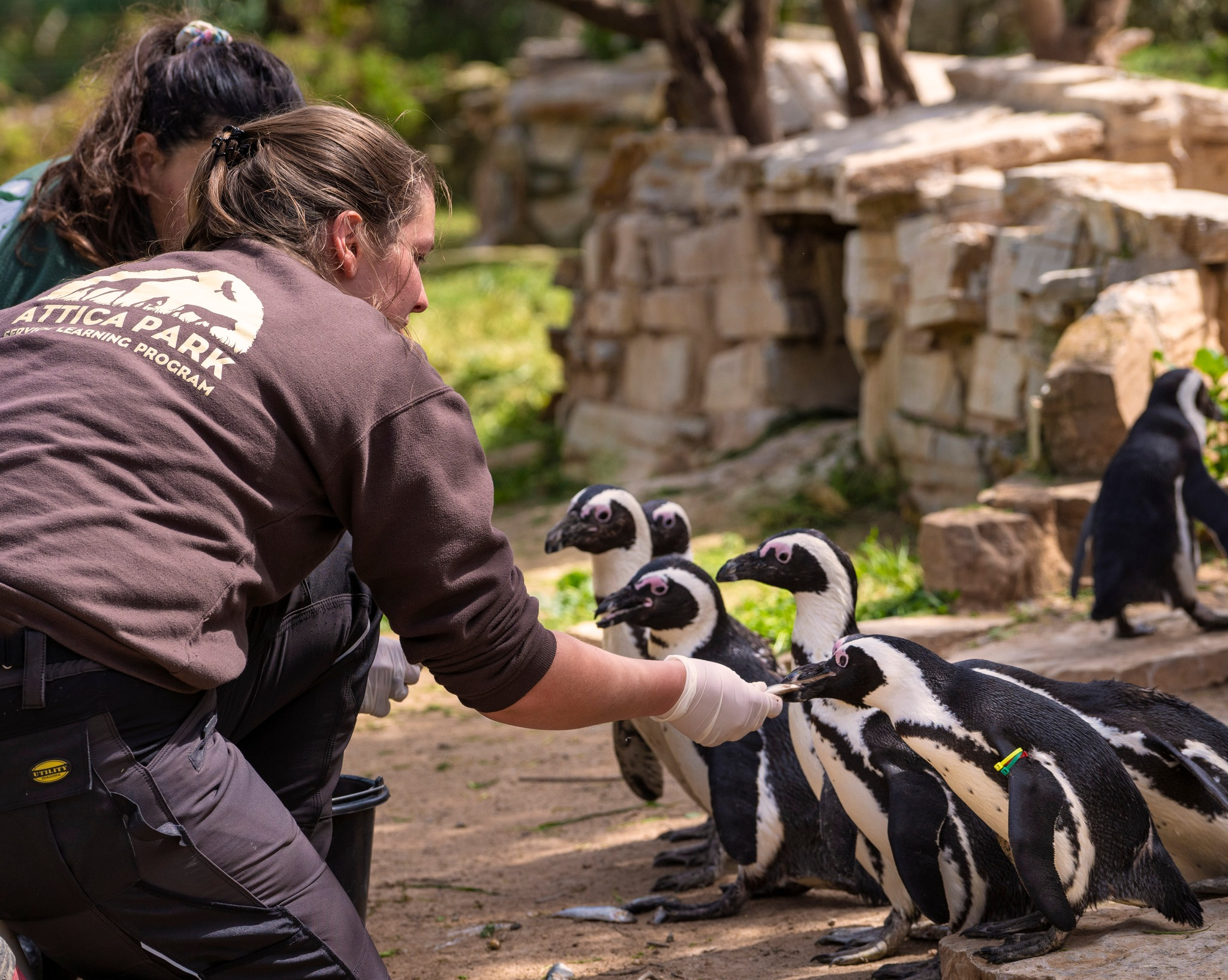
Zookeepers feeding the African penguins.

=== Water World ===
Water World consists of two big pond and an elevated kiosk that offers a view of the whole zoo. The pond is home to a variety of waterfowl and other aquatic birds. Water World residents include Egyptian geese, black swans, red-breasted geese, barnacle geese, ruddy shelducks, white storks and Canada geese.

=== Parrots & Lory Land ===
Parrots consists of a row of cages that are home to the zoos many parrot species. The exhibit is home to monk parakeets, keas, palm cockatoos, yellow-collared lovebirds, hooded parrots and African grey parrots.

Lory Land consists of a walk-through exhibit, that is home to rainbow lorikeets, chattering lories, purple-naped lories and yellow-bibbed lories.

=== Animals of S. America ===
Animals of S. America consists of four enclosures, one of which is a walk-through aviary, for species native to South America. This area is home to a family of greater rheas (two of which are leucistic), capybaras, Patagonian maras, llamas and giant anteaters. The walk-through aviary, was the first exhibit in this area, from when the zoo was just a bird park. The aviary is home to 11 birds native to the Americas as a whole, but it mostly features birds from South America, such as scarlet ibises, Chiloé wigeons, southern screamers, wood ducks and guira cuckoos. There can be found also a big cage with mamy species of Macaws such as: Red-and-green macaw, Military macaw and Blue and gold macaw and also a new exhibit with a fishing cat can be seen nearby.

=== Birds of Africa ===
Birds of Africa consists of a walk-through aviary, home to 10 bird species, the smallest mixed species aviary out of the three walk-though aviaries of the zoo, and its home to species such as the village weaver, glossy ibis, blue-winged goose, African spoonbill, superb starling, blacksmith lapwing and the hamerkop.

=== Birds of Asia ===
Birds of Asia consists of a walk-through aviary, home to 12 bird species, the largest mix of species out of the three continental themed aviaries, and its home to species from Asia and Australasia, such as the demoiselle crane, the crested pigeon, the red-whiskered bulbul, the maned duck and the Torresian imperial-pigeon. Next to the aviary its the zoo's main plaza and Educational Center.

== Other animals ==
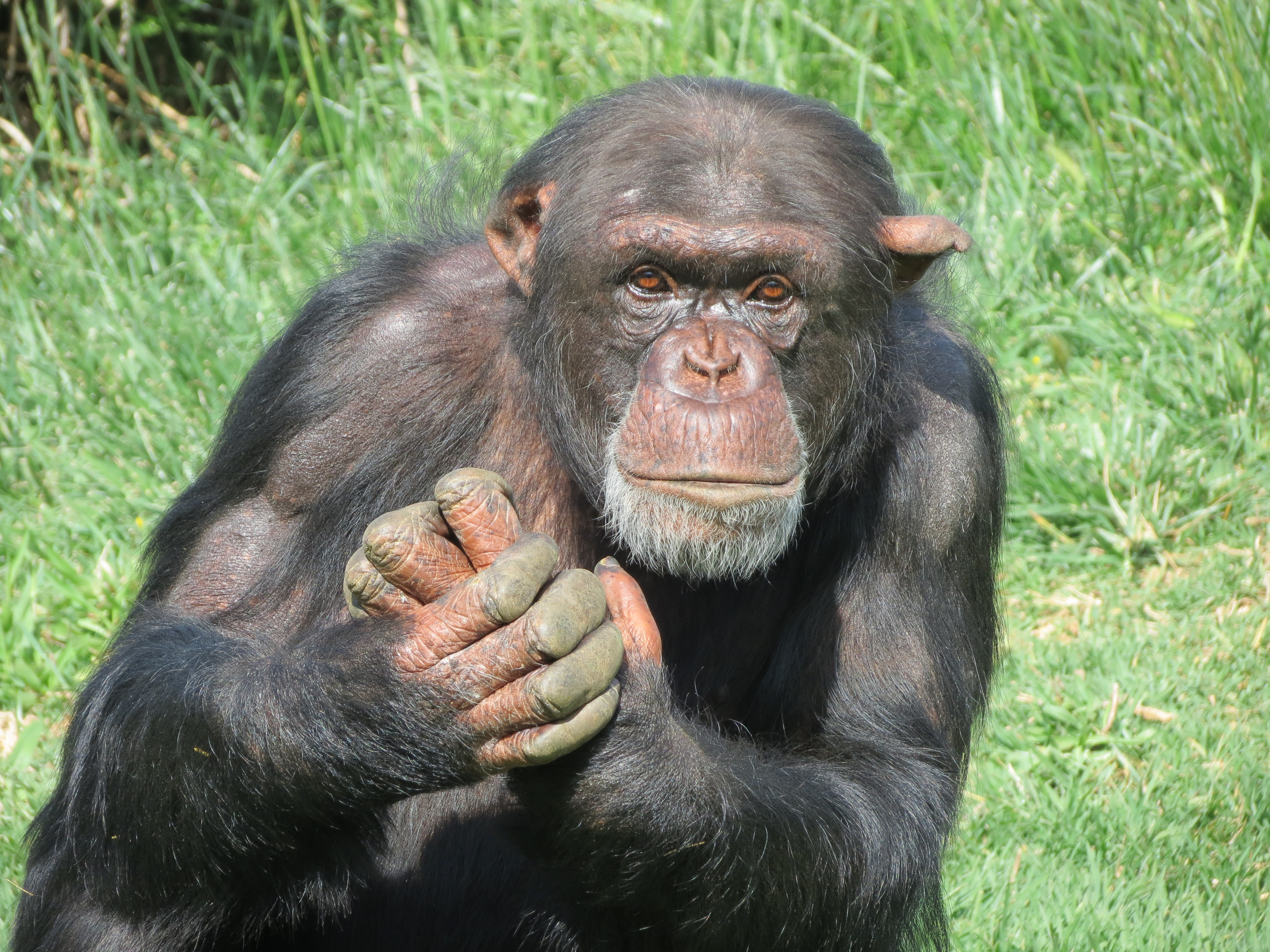
A chimpanzee in the park.

Other zoo residents, that do not belong to any particular attraction are the greater flamingoes, the Indian crested porcupine, the European bee-eater, the serval and more. The zoo's big cats include Southern African lions, Sumatran tigers, Persian leopards, pumas and as of 2020 a pair of clouded leopards that recently had cubs. The zoo has several walk-through enclosures, including a "Lemur Forest" the Birds of Africa, Asia and America the Lory Land and the Bat forest. In December 2015, two male Asian elephants, named Leso and Myo, arrived at the park from Emmen Zoo in the Netherlands. In 2018 the zoo welcomed a cauldron of Rodrigues flying foxes.

=== List of animals that have not been mentioned ===
- African grey hornbill
- African Penguin
- Aldabra giant tortoise
- American alligator
- Australian boobook
- Azure-winged magpie
- Barbary macaque
- Reeves's muntjac
- Black-tailed prairie dog
- Black-throated magpie-jay
- Brahminy starling
- Burmese python
- Crowned lapwing
- East Javan langur
- European wildcat
- Fennec fox
- Red Panda
- Golden-breasted starling
- Great blue turaco
- California sea lion
- Koi
- Leopard tortoise
- Marabou stork
- Namaqua dove
- Northern bald ibis
- Red-and-yellow barbet
- Red-eared slider
- Ring tailed lemur
- Ring-tailed coati
- Salmon-crested cockatoo
- Asian small-clawed otter
- Southern cassowary
- Tufted capuchin

== Future Extensions ==
In 2021, the zoo began constructions for an Asian enclosure that will house red pandas, Chinese muntjacs and Asian small-clawed otters, and will expect them in the following months. In June of 2022 the zoo announced the arrival of a pair of Linnaeus's two-toed sloths, with the male coming from Munich Zoo and the female coming from Parque de las Ciencias which also houses the BioDome which is where the Granada's zoo is located.

== Breeding programs ==
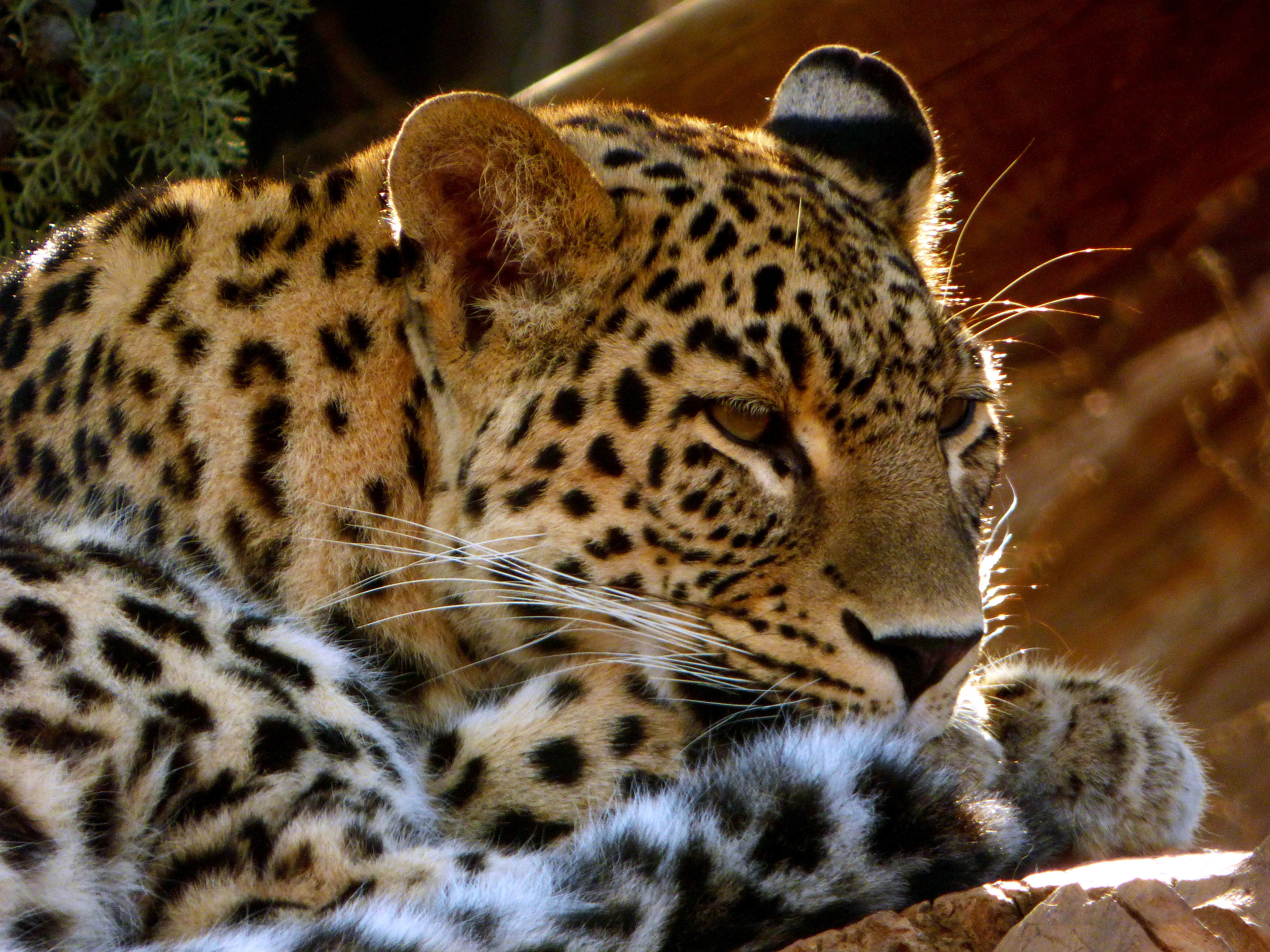
A Persian leopard in the park.

Attica Zoological Park actively participates in major programs of global importance. One of this programs was developed by WWF Russia and the Russian Academy of Sciences in collaboration with the Ministry of Natural Resources in Russia, the European Endangered Species Program of EAZA (EEP) of this species, Sochi Natural Park and other key partners.

The aim of this program is the breeding of this species in a controlled environment and the gradual reintroduction of their offspring in the Northern Caucasus, where today there are less than 10 individuals left in the wild, risking complete extinction of the species.

The Attica Zoological Park, with the help of Parc des Félins in France, acts as a key center for the safe and successful breeding of Persian leopards, by hosting a breeding pair in a specially designed enclosure.

== Conservation ==
In May 2001, the Attica Zoological Park became a member of EAZA. The AZP is actively involved in 37 EEPs (European Endangered species Programs), and 31 species in the park are monitored by ESBs (European Studbooks), as well as other advanced methods such as Species360 (International Species Information System).

In 2011, PELARGOS, an independent non-profit civil company, was founded by the zoo's owner and the park's co-owner at the time, Rudy Rallis. This organisation fights for the protection and conservation of Greek wildlife. Since its creation, PELARGOS has carried out a number of important projects in collaboration with some of the most respected and recognizable conservation organizations in Greece. Until recently PELARGOS was financed only by Attica Park's contributions, as dictated by the charter of EAZA. More recently PELARGOS has also gone ahead with initiatives financed by third parties such as, the Niarchos Foundation and the Green Fund of the Ministry of Environment. Apart from the financial support it offers, Attica Park also provides substantial help through its scientific knowledge, its international relations with recognized scientists, and mostly through the work and dedicated support of its staff.

A first aid station for the Mediterranean monk seal was built in the zoo's premises in collaboration with MOm (Hellenic Society for the Study and Protection of the Monk Seal). The station was built and was fully equipped with the full financial support of PELARGOS. The station mostly helps young seals that lost their mothers due to weather conditions, until they can be reintroduction in the National Marine Park of Alonnisos Northern Sporades. Since 2015 the zoo has nursed and released six monk seals with the last two being released in 2019.

In 2014 and after five weeks of rehabilitation in the zoo, a golden jackal was released in the protected area of the Moustos wetland.

In January 2016 the zoo released a great white pelican at Lake Kerkini, and on November of the same year the zoo released multiple wader species in Missolonghi–Aitoliko lagoon.

In June 2015 the zoo received three griffon vultures from ANIMA's rehabilitation facility, where they had arrived exhausted or poisoned. During their stay in the zoo, they were able to regain strength and reinforce their social behaviour, so as to be reintroduced successfully in the wild. on 19 November 2015, a team from Attica Zoological Park, in collaboration with ANIMA and the Natural History Museum of Crete, travelled to the Lasithi Range in Crete, where six vultures were successfully released. Three from AZP and another three from ANIMA's Rehabilitation Center.

== Incidents and criticism ==
In June 2010 the dolphinarium started working with shows by sea lions and dolphins. There were initially four dolphins bought from the Lithuanian Marine Institute, then seven more were added from the same source. The Greek Green Party took Attica Zoological Park to court claiming animal welfare issues in 2011. In April 2011, a provisional order was issued by the Athens Court temporarily prohibiting the operation of the dolphinarium. BBC sent a correspondent to cover the story and the controversy was presented in an article by Lauren St John in The Sunday Times. In August 2011, the Greek court issued a decision declaring itself not competent to pass judgement on the case. Although the zoo claimed that the case in question has been decided permanently and that the company has been vindicated, this decision only addressed the ability of this particular court to decide the issue.

In December 2018, two jaguars, escaped their controlled area, triggering the security protocol. The two big cats, named Jenny and Spotty, escaped their enclosure, after a gazelle, that was ready to be transferred to another facility, escaped and crashed on the enclosure's glass fence. The animals escaped from a hole in the broken glass while the park was still open. The staff, with the help of the park's vet, shot the two animals and killed them. The zoo's owner stated that they could not sedate the animals, because anesthesia in big cats, such as tigers and lions, takes 5 to 6 minutes to kick in and that would put the park's visitors and staff in danger.
