= Olivia Mandle =

Spanish environmental and animal rights activist (born 2007)

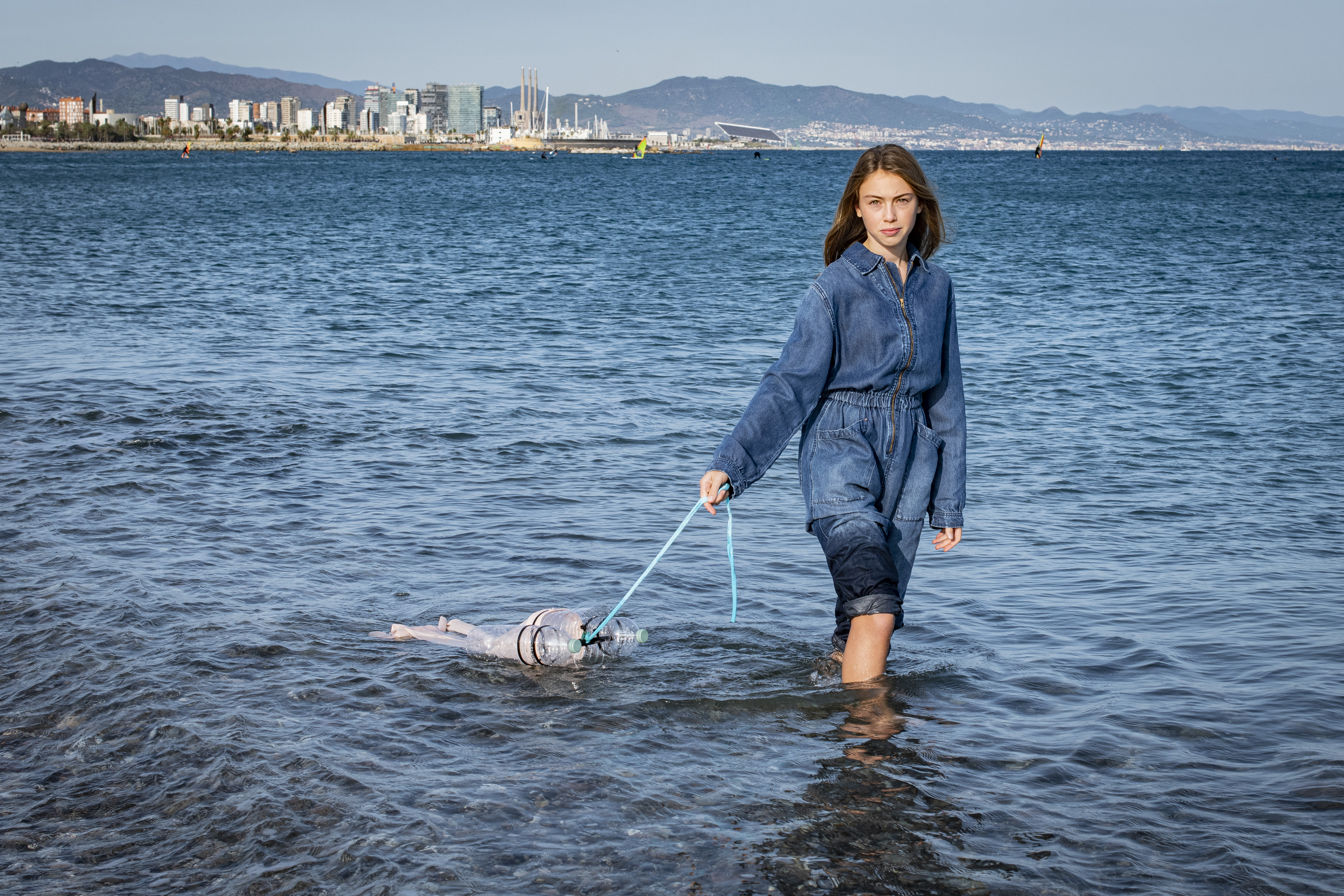
- Born: Olivia Mandle Navarro; 2007 (age 18–19); Barcelona, Spain
- Occupations: Environmental activist; animal rights activist
- Years active: 2019–present

Olivia Mandle Navarro (born 2007) is a Spanish environmental and animal rights activist from Barcelona. She leads the campaign #NoEsPaísParaDelfines ("Spain is no country for dolphins"), which asks the Spanish government for a law to close the country's dolphinariums, and in April 2023 she delivered more than 150,000 signatures in its support to the Congress of Deputies. Spanish media have dubbed her "the Spanish Greta Thunberg".

Mandle created the Jelly Cleaner, a homemade floating device for collecting microplastics from the sea surface, and is an ambassador of the European Commission's European Climate Pact and of the La España Azul expedition. She has published her first book, Sí es cosa tuya, and in 2023 began presenting Kanviem?, a programme about climate change in Catalonia, on the 3Cat platform.

== Early life ==
Mandle was born in Barcelona in 2007. Her environmental activism started at twelve, when she visited an exhibition in New York about the effects of global warming; she has recalled being struck by a National Geographic cover showing a plastic bag floating in the water, and names primatologist Jane Goodall, oceanographer Sylvia Earle and broadcaster David Attenborough among her role models. She wants to study marine biology and to open a marine sanctuary in the Empordà, on the Costa Brava.

== Activism ==
Mandle began her climate activism in 2019, at the age of twelve, when she created the Jelly Cleaner, a device for collecting microplastics from the surface of the sea. The device floats, is built from household materials such as two plastic bottles and a pair of old tights, and traps small plastic particles in the mesh; the European Commission has noted that its main effect is the curiosity it arouses among beachgoers, which Mandle uses to talk about plastic pollution.

At thirteen, she started a petition on Change.org asking that the last three dolphins at Barcelona Zoo be moved to a marine sanctuary; it gathered more than 57,000 signatures, but the dolphins were instead transferred to the Attica Zoological Park in Athens. She then sent weekly certified letters to Sergio Antonio García Torres, the director general for Animal Rights in the Spanish government, until she obtained a meeting with him to ask for a ban on dolphinariums in Spain. She later launched a second petition, #NoEsPaísParaDelfines, addressed to prime minister Pedro Sánchez and backed by the Bottlenose Dolphin Research Institute and the cosmetics retailer Lush, which created a soap in its support, asking for a law to close Spain's dolphinariums, which then numbered 11 of the 30 in Europe and held more than 55 per cent of the continent's captive dolphins.

In May 2021 Mandle was invited to the Senate by its first vice-president, Cristina Narbona, to present the campaign, which by September 2022 had passed 136,000 signatures. A proposal along the campaign's lines was presented in the Senate by the Spanish Socialist Workers' Party in 2021, and Mandle took part in the public hearing on the animal protection bill. The animal welfare law eventually passed in March 2023 left dolphins out, and by mid-2024 the petition had passed 158,000 signatures.

On 20 April 2023 Mandle delivered the petition, by then with more than 154,000 signatures, to the Congress of Deputies, accompanied by the organisation World Animal Protection, marine biologists and the actress Clara Lago; about ten dolphinariums were still operating in Spain at the time.

== Other work ==
Mandle is one of the more than 130 ambassadors of the European Commission's European Climate Pact, and also an ambassador of the La España Azul expedition. Her first book, Sí es cosa tuya ("It is your business", Ediciones B), recounts how, as a small child at a dolphinarium, she first learned about the reality of captivity. Also in 2023 she began presenting Kanviem?, a programme on the new Catalan streaming platform 3Cat in which she examines the effects of climate change in Catalonia.

== Awards ==
The Jane Goodall Institute has described Mandle as a "young inspiration", and gave her its international Mini Heroína award for her career. The Food and Agriculture Organization named her one of its Food Heroes for World Food Day 2023. In 2026 Forbes Spain included her in its 30 Under 30 list.
