= Yoyo (elephant) =

African elephant noted for age (died 2024)

- Species: African elephant
- Sex: Female
- Born: c. 1970
- Died: 27 December 2024 (aged c. 54); Barcelona Zoo
- Years active: 2009-2024

Yoyo (c. 1970 - 28 December 2024) was an African elephant known as the world's longest-living captive African elephant, who died at the Barcelona Zoo at approximately 54 years of age.

== Biography ==
Before arriving at the zoo, Yoyo was rescued in 2009 after having spent time in a circus, which caused physical and psychological injuries that required specialized treatment.

She arrived at the zoo in 2009 as part of an international species conservation program, in which the center participates alongside the Government of Spain. Although her exact birth date is unknown, it is estimated that she was over 54 years old, while the average life expectancy for her species is 39 years. She lived at the Barcelona Zoo with two other elephants. Yoyo was in a cohesive group with two other elderly elephants Susi and Bully. These two were also receiving special treatment and all became very close.

== Before Barcelona ==
Yoyo was an African elephant and the largest land mammal on our earth. Elephants usually live to around 39 years old but Yoyo was expected to be around 54 when she passed. Before coming to the Barcelona zoo in 2009, Yoyo began as a circus elephant and later moved to an amusement park called Rioleon safari. At these previous homes Yoyo was mentally and physically abused by her owners and later made her require lots of attention at Barcelona Zoo.

== During Barcelona Zoo ==
After being brought to the Barcelona zoo, Yoyo's life improved. The zoo's staff was part of the CITES affiliation that specialized in creating housing for rescued animals. Also part of that group were Susi and Bully, both elderly elephants in a similar position to Yoyo. Before passing, Yoyo's health was on a decline due to her old age but staff at the zoo provided all the efforts they could to keep her happy and healthy. She was becoming weak as the days went on and there wasn't much else to do.

== See also ==
- List of individual elephants
