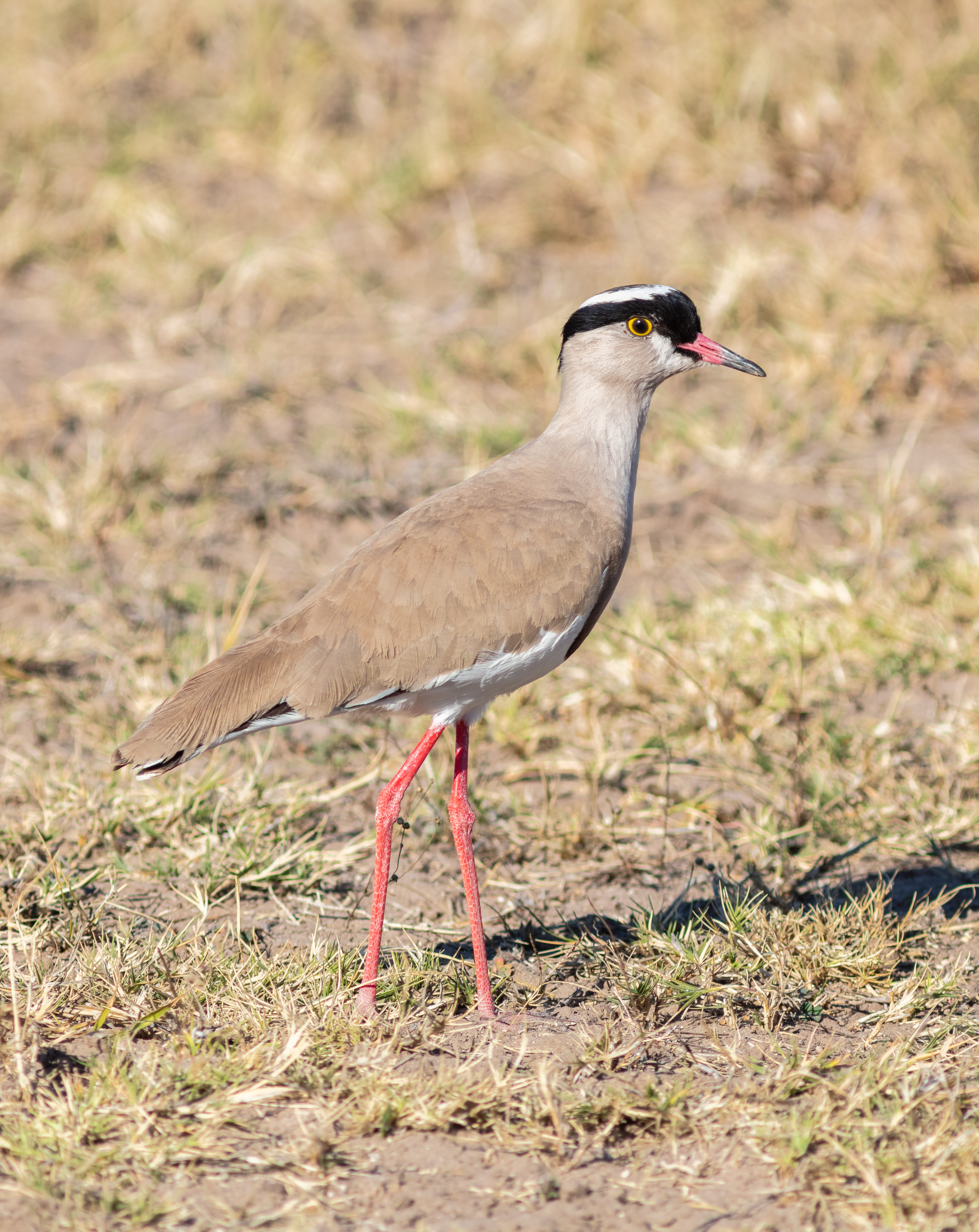
- In Mikumi National Park, Tanzania

Conservation status
- Least Concern (IUCN 3.1)

Scientific classification
- Kingdom: Animalia
- Phylum: Chordata
- Class: Aves
- Order: Charadriiformes
- Family: Charadriidae
- Genus: Vanellus
- Species: V. coronatus

Binomial name
- Vanellus coronatus (Boddaert, 1783)

Synonyms
- Charadrius coronatus (Boddaert, 1783); Hoplopterus coronatus (Boddaert, 1783); Stephanibyx coronatus (Boddaert, 1783)

= Crowned lapwing =

Species of bird

The crowned lapwing (Vanellus coronatus), crowned plover or kiewiet (in South African English), is a bird of the lapwing subfamily that occurs contiguously from the Red Sea coast of Somalia to southern and southwestern Africa. It is an adaptable and numerous species, with bold and noisy habits. It is related to the more localized black-winged and Senegal lapwings, with which it shares some plumage characteristics.

== Taxonomy ==
The crowned lapwing was described by the French polymath Georges-Louis Leclerc, Comte de Buffon in 1781 in his Histoire Naturelle des Oiseaux from a specimen collected in the Cape of Good Hope region of South Africa. The bird was also illustrated in a hand-coloured plate engraved by François-Nicolas Martinet in the Planches Enluminées D'Histoire Naturelle which was produced under the supervision of Edme-Louis Daubenton to accompany Buffon's text. Neither the plate caption nor Buffon's description included a scientific name but in 1783 the Dutch naturalist Pieter Boddaert coined the binomial name Charadrius coronatus in his catalogue of the Planches Enluminées. The crowned lapwing is now placed in the genus Vanellus that was erected by the French zoologist Mathurin Jacques Brisson in 1760. The generic name Vanellus is the Medieval Latin for a "lapwing". It is a diminutive of the Latin vanus meaning "winnowing" or "fan". The specific epithet coronatus is Latin for "crowned".

Three subspecies are recognised:

- V. c. demissus (Friedmann, 1928) – north Somalia
- V. c. coronatus (Boddaert, 1783) – Ethiopia and east Africa to Zambia and South Africa
- V. c. xerophilus Clancey, 1960 – southwest Angola to west South Africa and west Zimbabwe

== Description ==
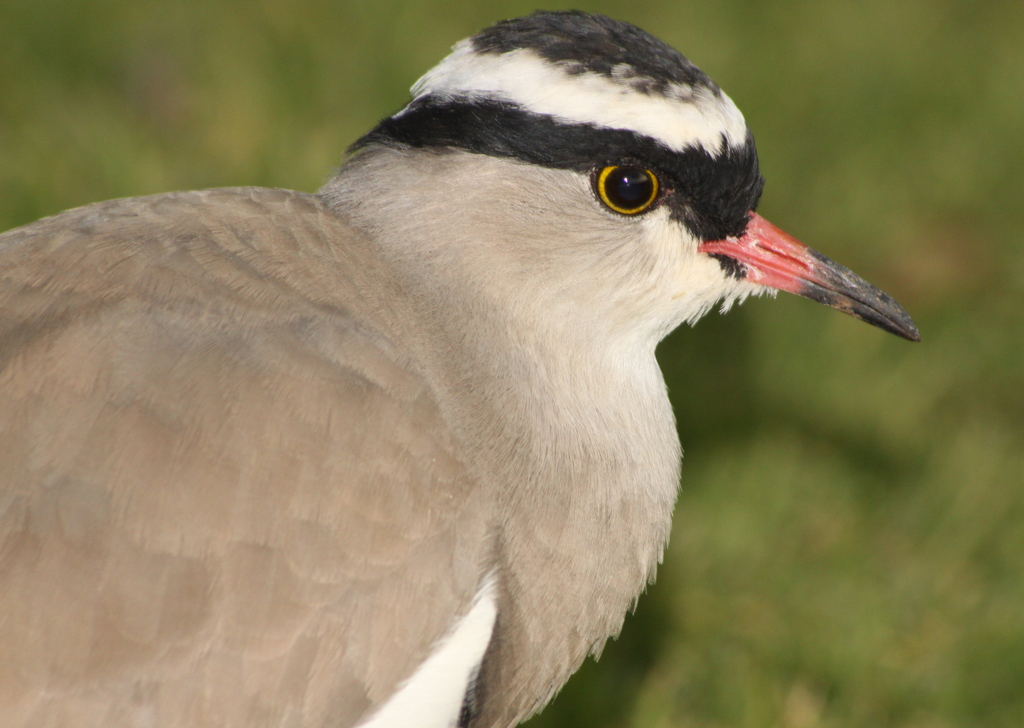
Close-up of a bird in Johannesburg

The crowned lapwing is easily recognized by its combination of brown and white colours, with most tellingly, a black crown intersected by an annular white halo. Adults are noisy and conspicuous.

Males measure on average 3% larger than females. Juveniles are dull versions of adults, vermiculated on the wings and mantle, the legs yellowy rather than red and the bill lacking the red base.

== Habitat and numbers ==
Crowned lapwings prefer short, dry grassland which may be overgrazed or burnt, but avoid mountains. In higher-rainfall areas such as parts of Zambia and Zimbabwe, they occur mainly as dry-season visitors. In dry regions of northern Botswana, however, they are attracted in large numbers when good rainfall occurs. In southern Africa their highest concentrations are to be found in the dry central Kalahari region.

Although generally outnumbered by blacksmith lapwings, they are the most widespread and locally the most numerous lapwing species in their area of distribution. Their numbers have increased in the latter part of the 20th century after benefiting from a range of human activities. They live up to 20 years.

The crowned lapwing is one of the species to which the Agreement on the Conservation of African-Eurasian Migratory Waterbirds (AEWA) applies.

== Behaviour ==
Crowned lapwings and the more localized black-winged lapwings sometimes associate and do not show mutual aggression, even within breeding territories. Different crowned lapwing males do however posture aggressively when nesting territories are established. The loser in an encounter assumes a special posture to signal his defeat.

Bare-part colours of males brighten in the breeding season. Different types of display flights lure the female to the defended territory. A female accepting the male and territory will follow the male during his display flight. Mates may be retained for life. Egg-laying is timed to precede the rainy season and most incubating is done by the female. The male assists only on hot days, when he either incubates or shades the nest.

== Food ==
Their diet consists of a variety of insects, but termites and ants form an important component. These insects are often extracted from the dung of large mammals. They feed mainly by surface pecking as opposed to digging.

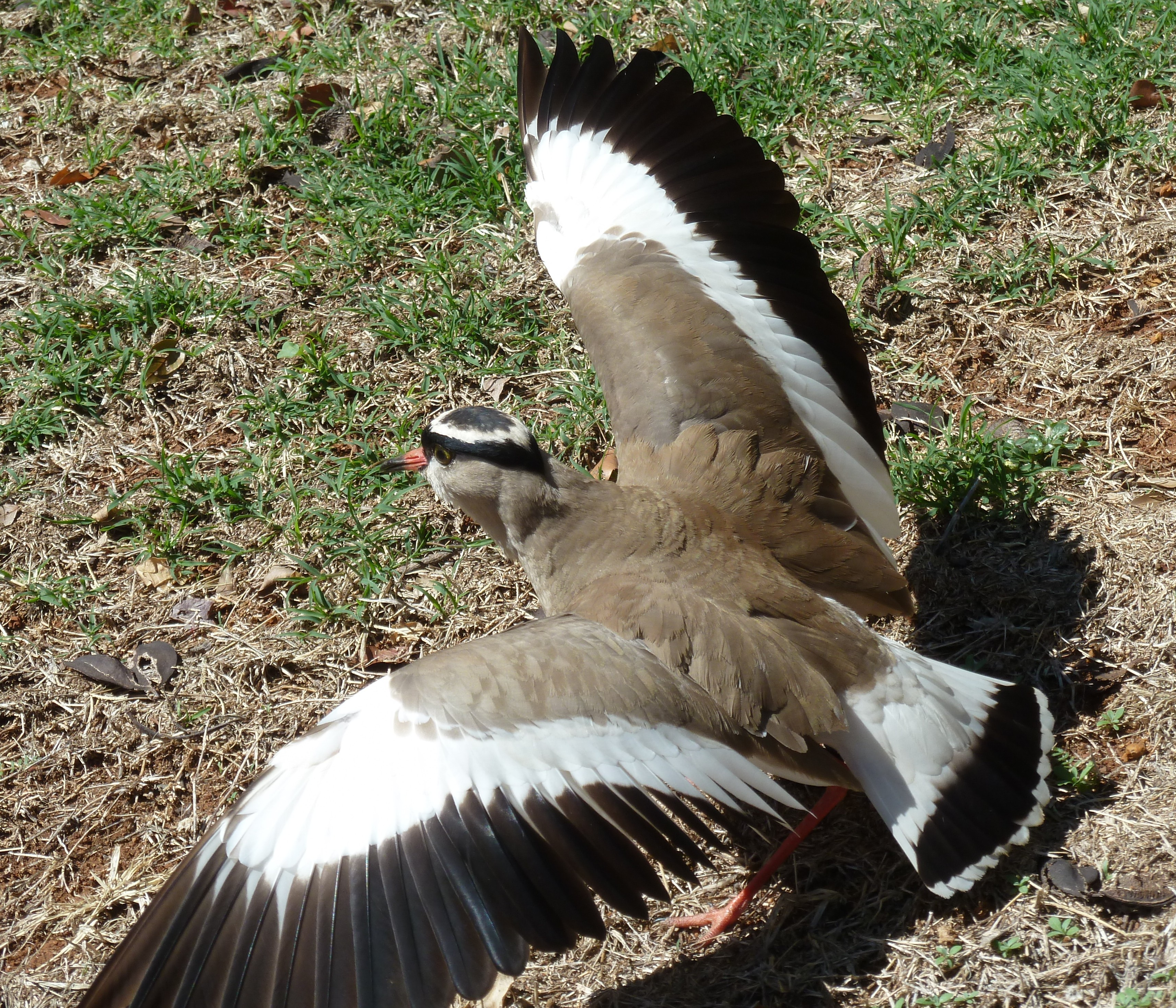
Performing a noisy distraction display near a nest

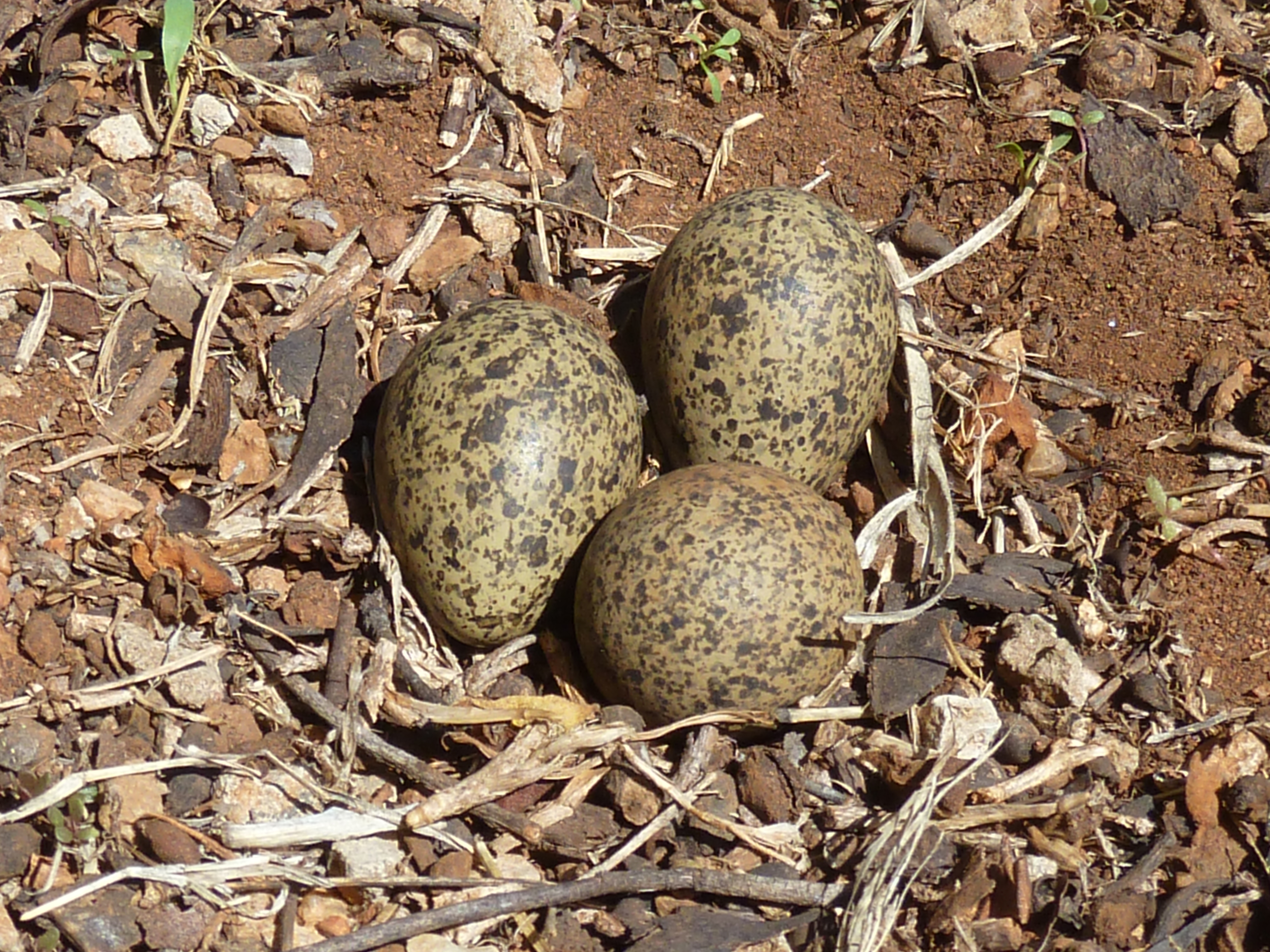
Clutch on matching plant debris

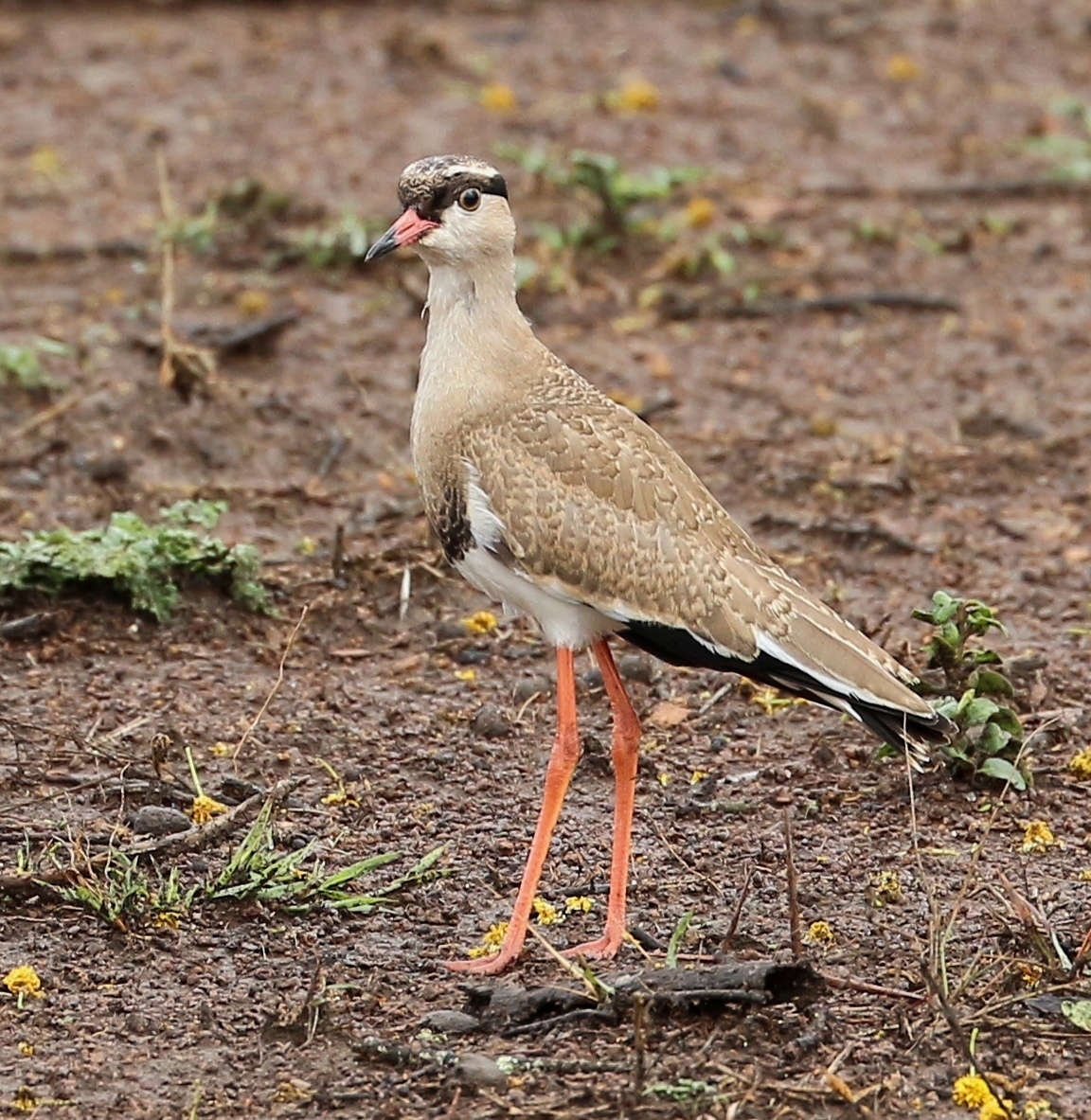
A juvenile in the Zulu Nyala Game Reserve, South Africa

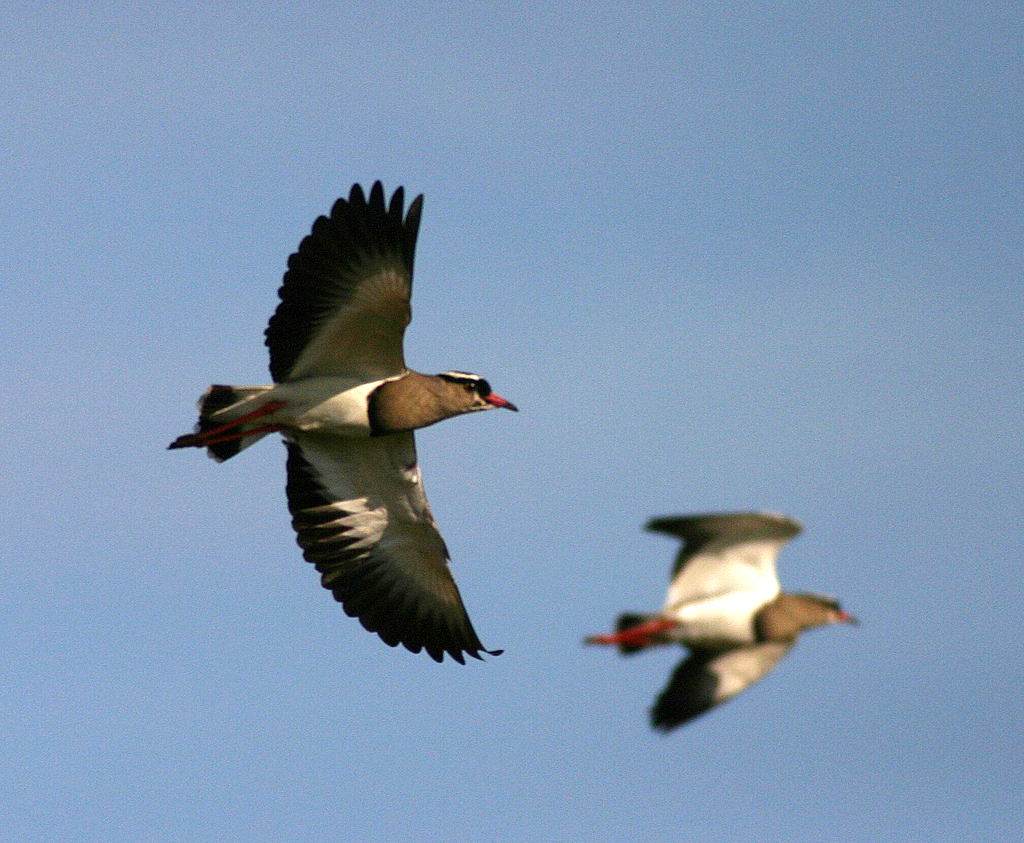
Crowned lapwings in flight
