= Moustos wetland =

Wetland and lagoon in Greece

- Moustos lagoon
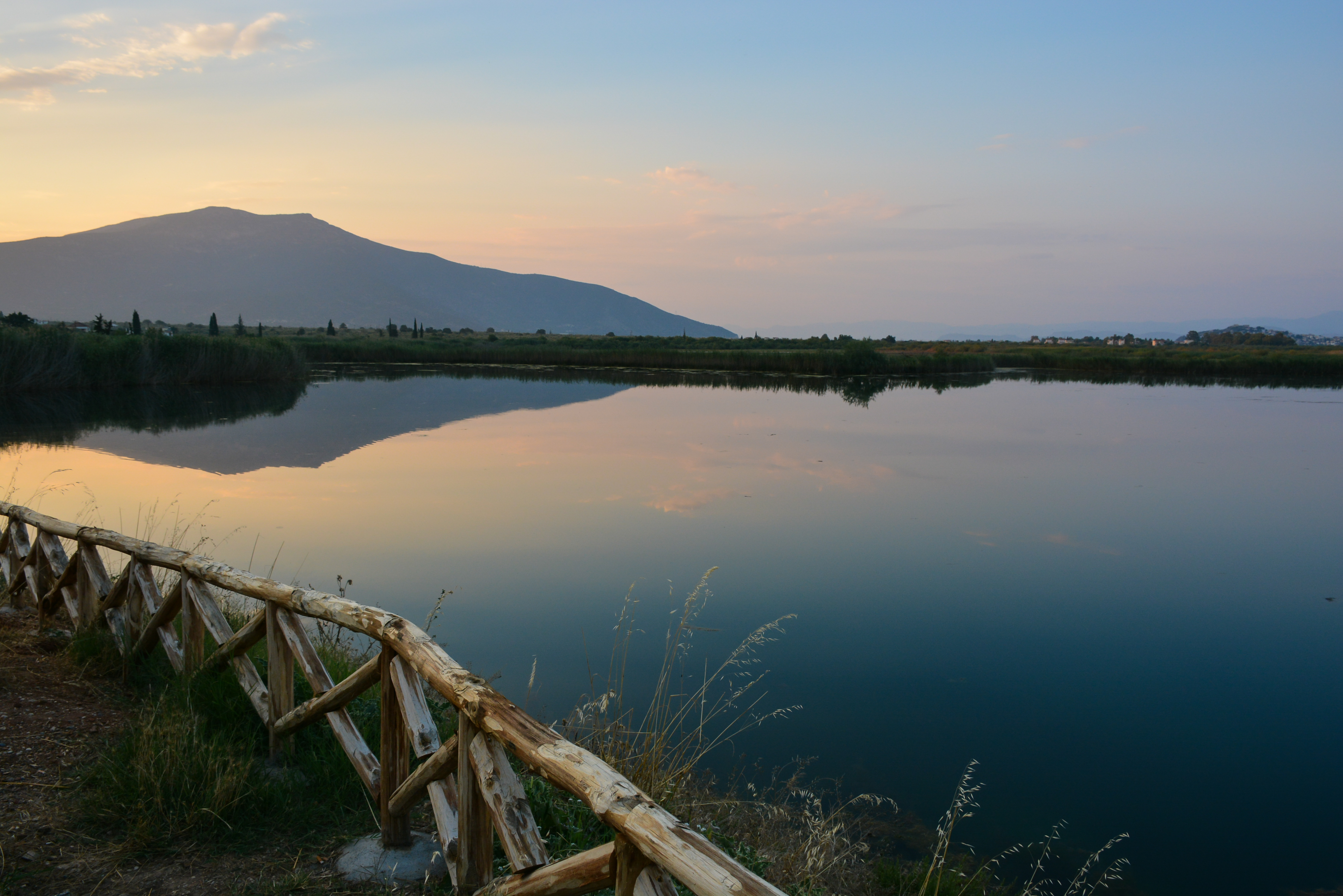
- Sunset at Moustos wetland

- Location within Greece
- Location: North Kynouria, Arcadia, Peloponnese
- Nearest city: Astros, Greece
- Coordinates: 37.386242°N 22.745856°E
- Area: 3.39 square kilometres (840 acres)
- Established: 29 March 2011
- Governing body: Management Body of Mount Parnon and Moustos Wetland
- Website: fdparnonas.gr

Moustos is a wetland located a few kilometers from Astros. It divides the Thyreatis plain into two parts, the plain of Astros and the plain of Agios Andreas.

== History ==
By the 1950s it had a total area of 2.500 acres, but the expansion of cropland into marshy land limited its area to 850 acres. The lake contains two main and permanent coastal lakes, the depth of which does not exceed 5 meters: the homonymous lake and a smaller one called Heronisi. It is connected to the sea by two artificial canals, which were the work of the Bavarian engineer Otto, made in order to drain part of the lake, because the inhabitants of the surrounding villages suffered from malaria. The first canal was opened by the Bavarian architect, thus it is still called "Bavarian" to this day. At the beginning of the 20th century fish were abundant and the fishing rights were given to its tenants. In those years, the legend of the "Beast of Moustos" was created, a beast whose roar could be heard sounded during the night up until the mountains.

== The lake today ==
Integrated into the Natura 2000 European Network, this wetland of Cynuria has been designated as a protected area, as it is a refuge for a significant population of migratory birds that overwinter there (wild swans, herons, mallards, Eurasian coots). Its dense reeds nest: falcons, purple herons and a small number of endangered black-winged stilts. Other species of the fauna include flathead grey mullets, eels, marginated tortoises and toads and lizards protected by the Berne Convention and Greek law. The vegetation that grows on the edges of the wetland is mainly characterized by aquatic plants such as: reeds, thorns and alders, whilst around white crocus, red and white anemones, Greek cyclamens, poppies and the White Narcissus, a flower with a strong scent that the locals call Manusaki, can be found.

== Gallery ==
The wetland with Paralio Astros at the background

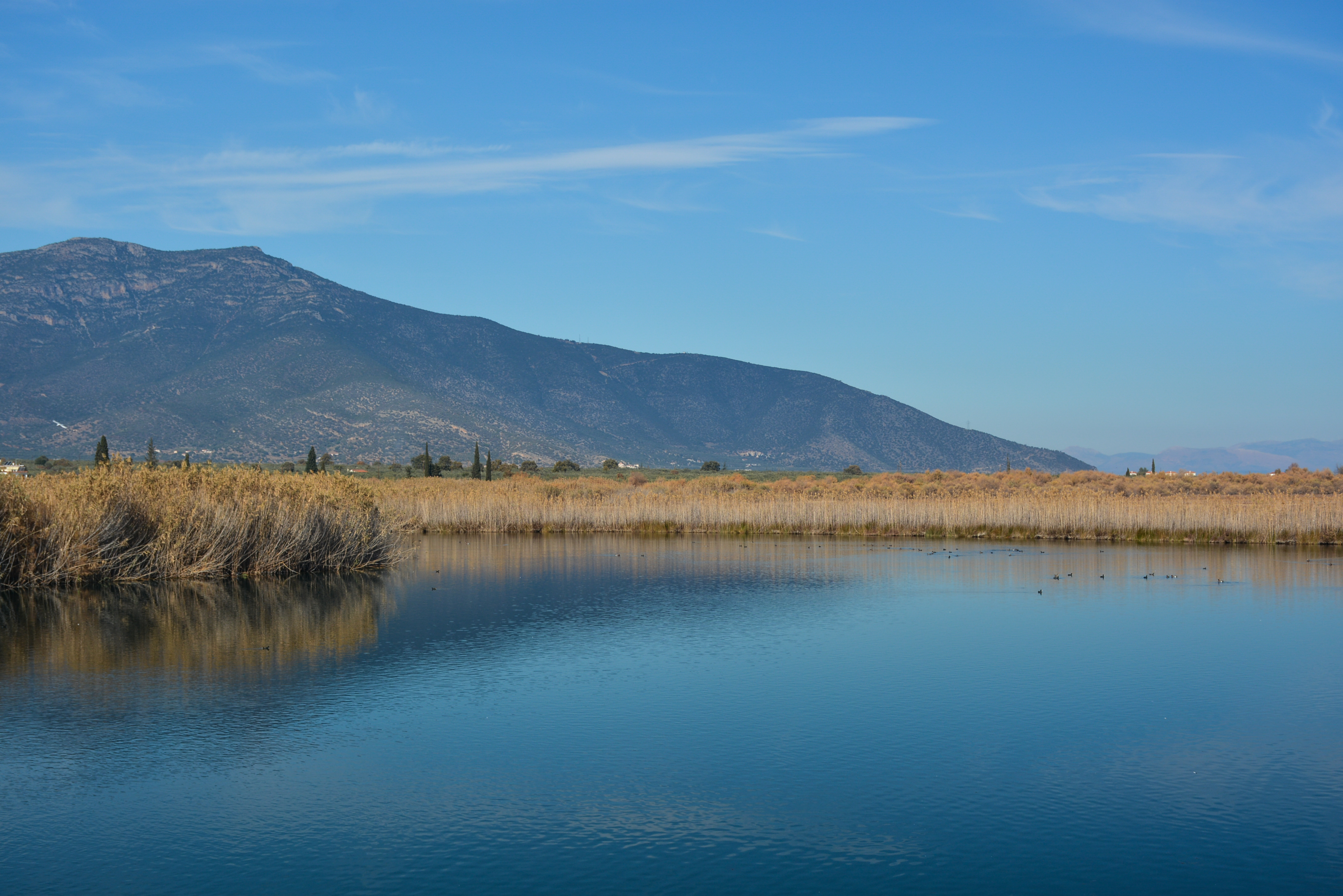
The lagoon of the wetland

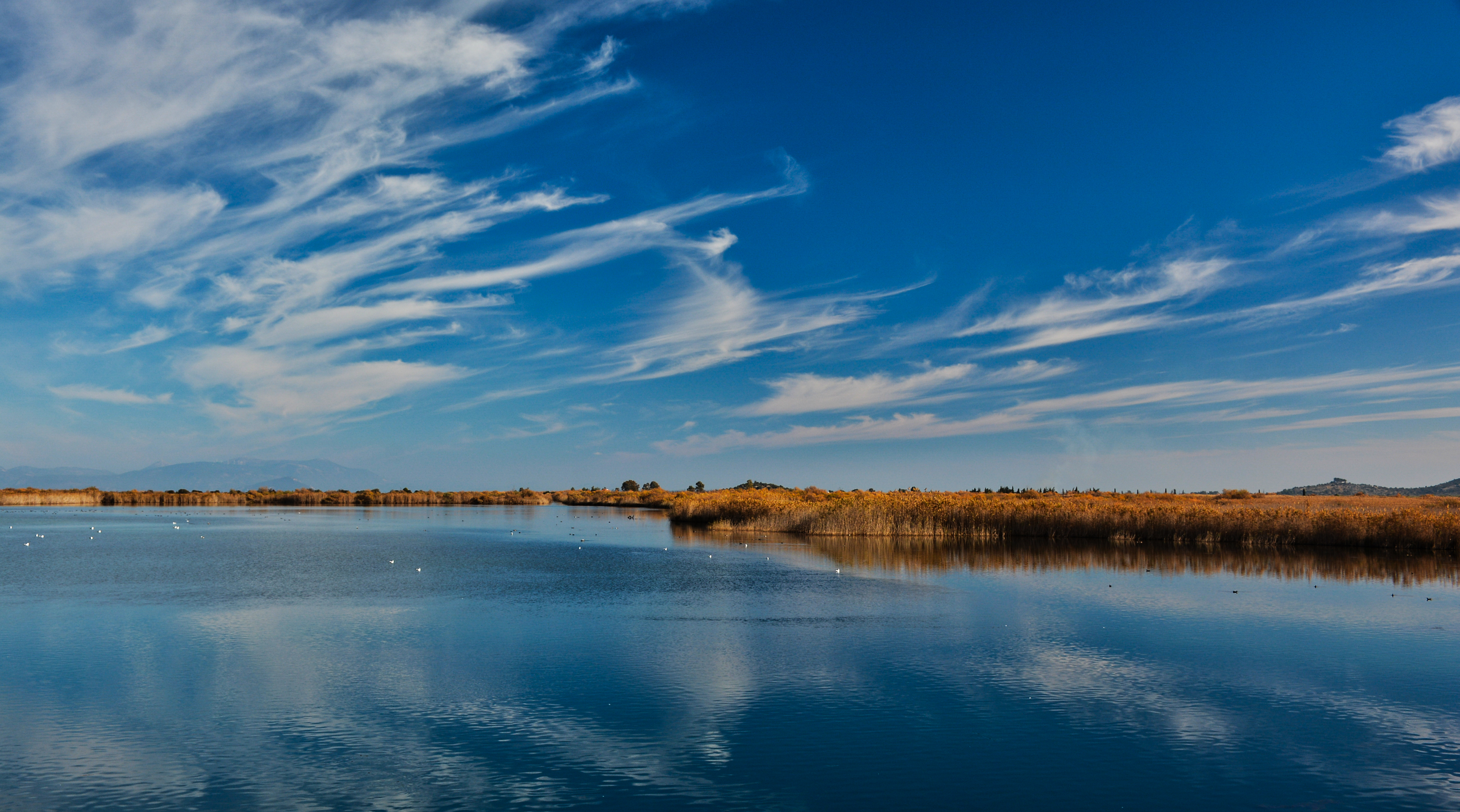
Moustos lagoon

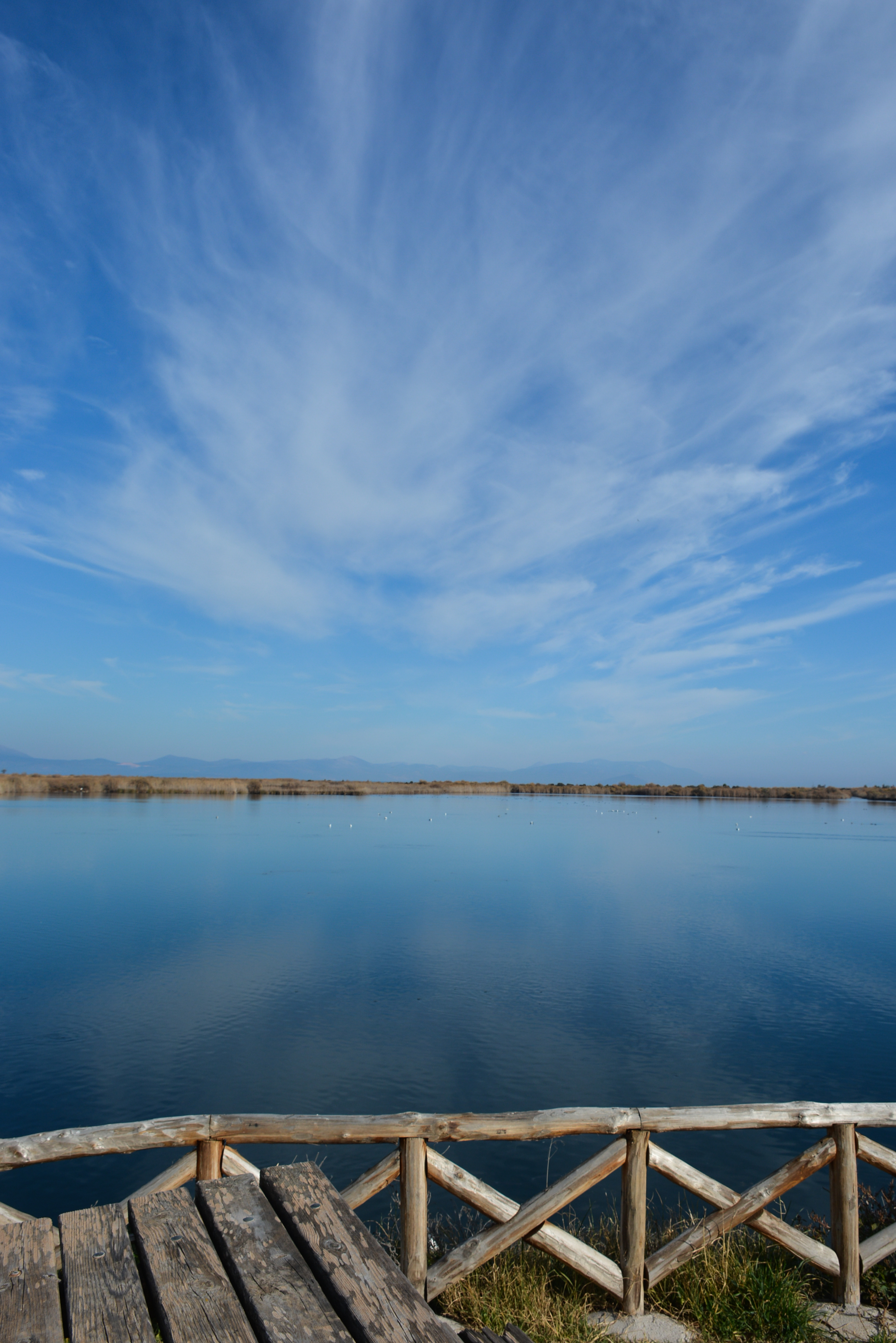
Caption of the lagoon

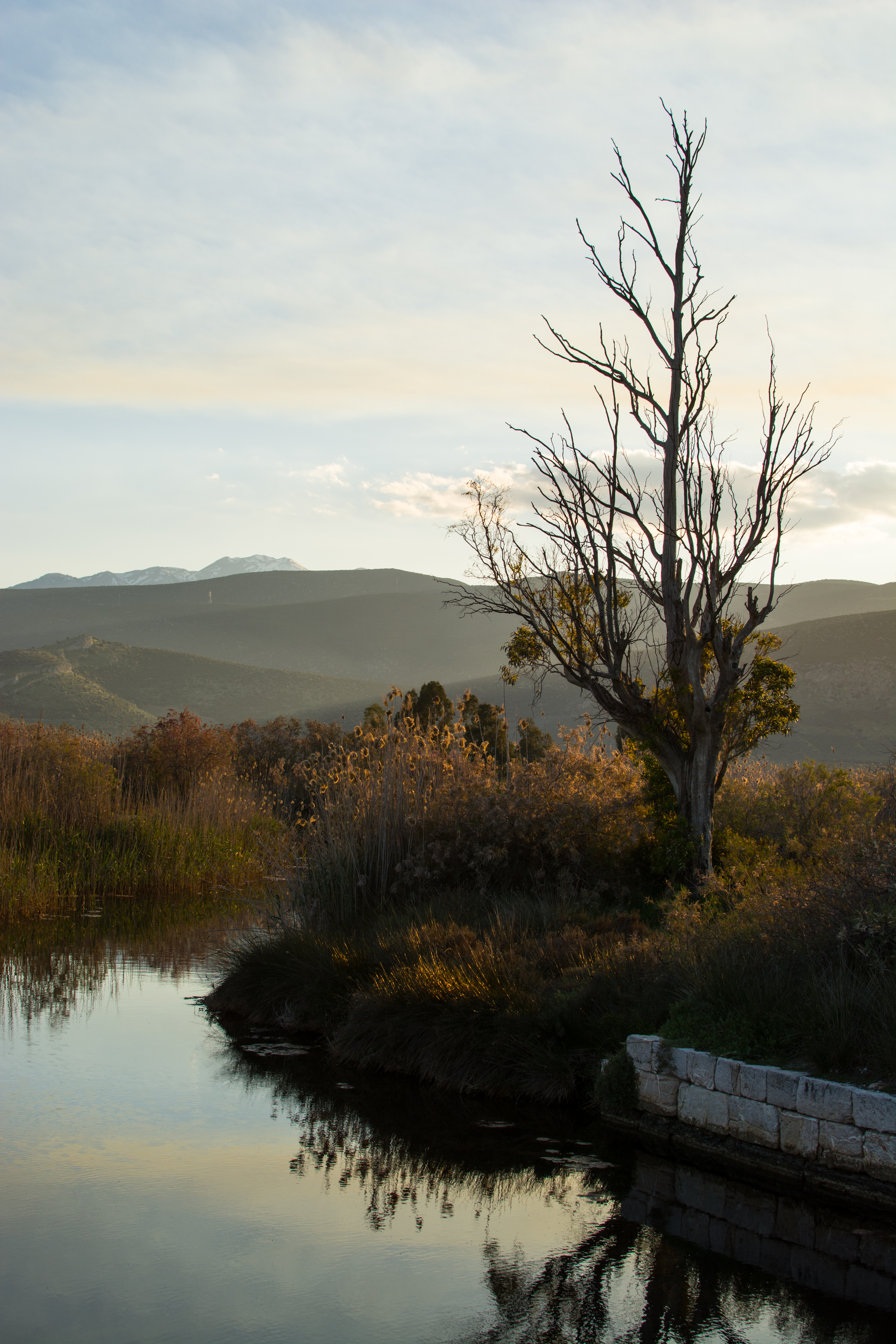
Tree at the wetland

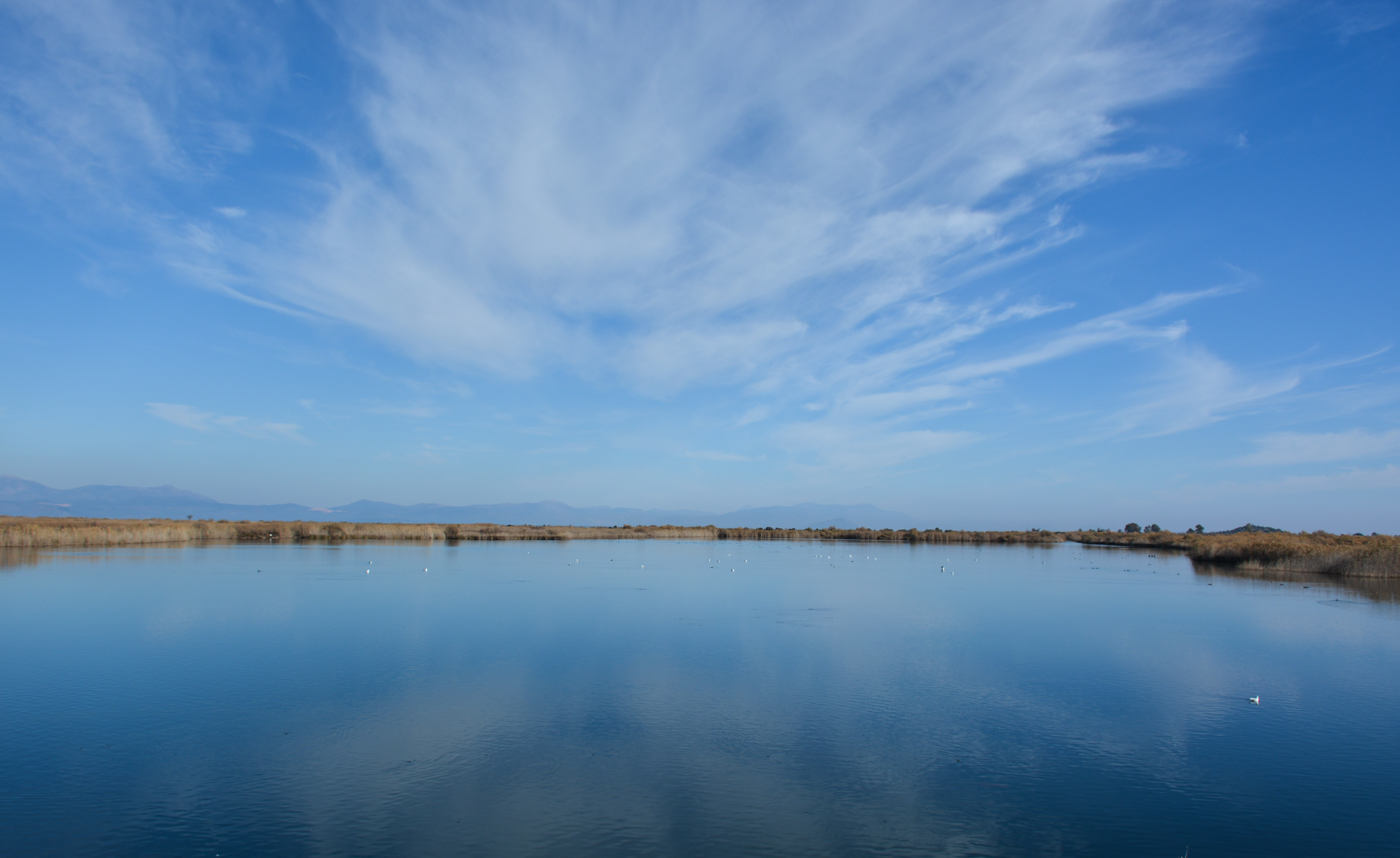
The lagoon and sky

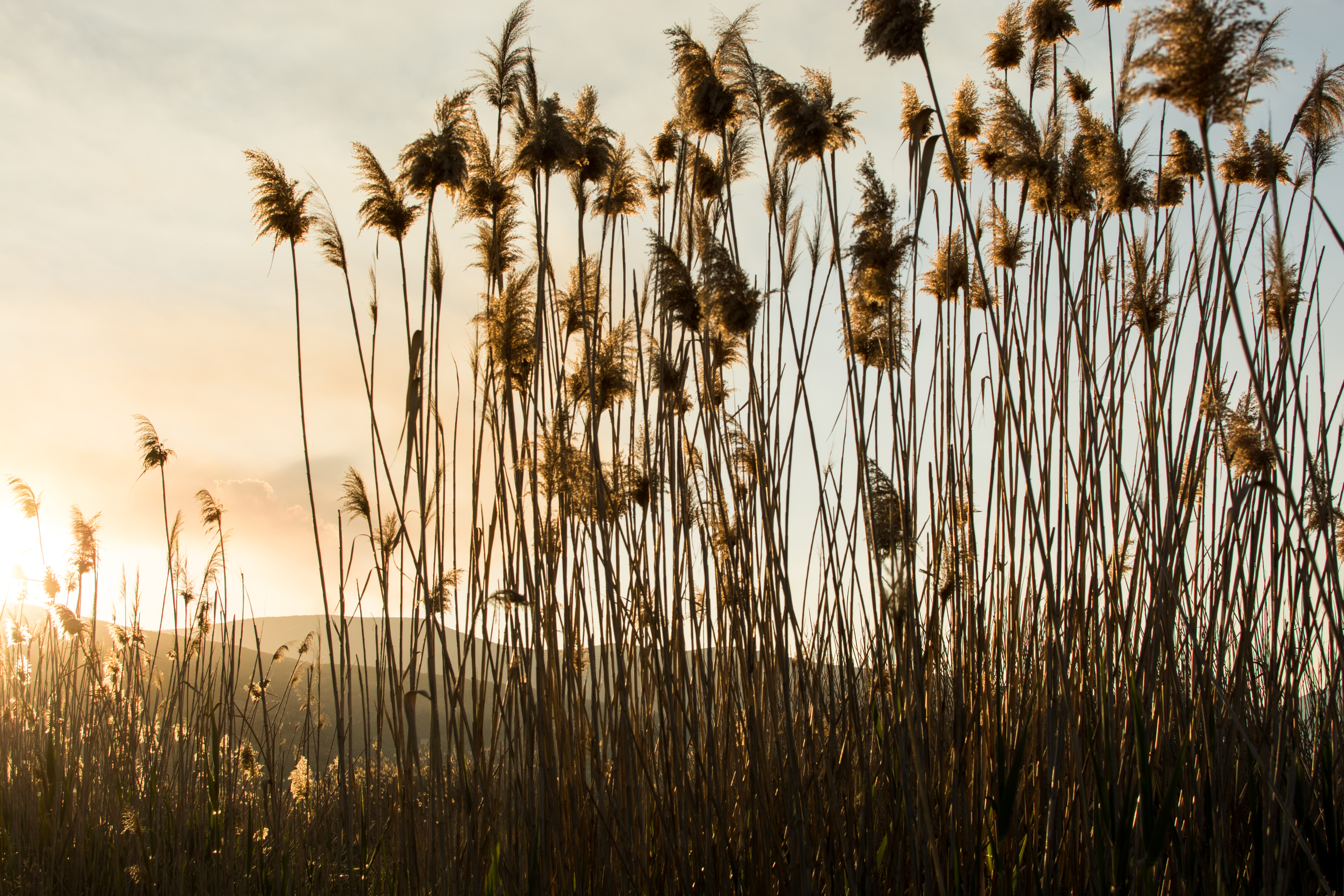
Wetland grasses

== See also ==
- Mount Parnon

== Sources ==
- Arcadia: the places and the passages of the water, Oiates publications, Petros Sarantakis, Athens 2003. ISBN 960-91420-1-X.
