= Țara Litua =

Former country (1247-1330), now a part of modern-day Romania

Țara Litua Țara Litua (Romanian) Цара Лйтȣа (Romanian Cyrillic)
- c. 13th century–1330
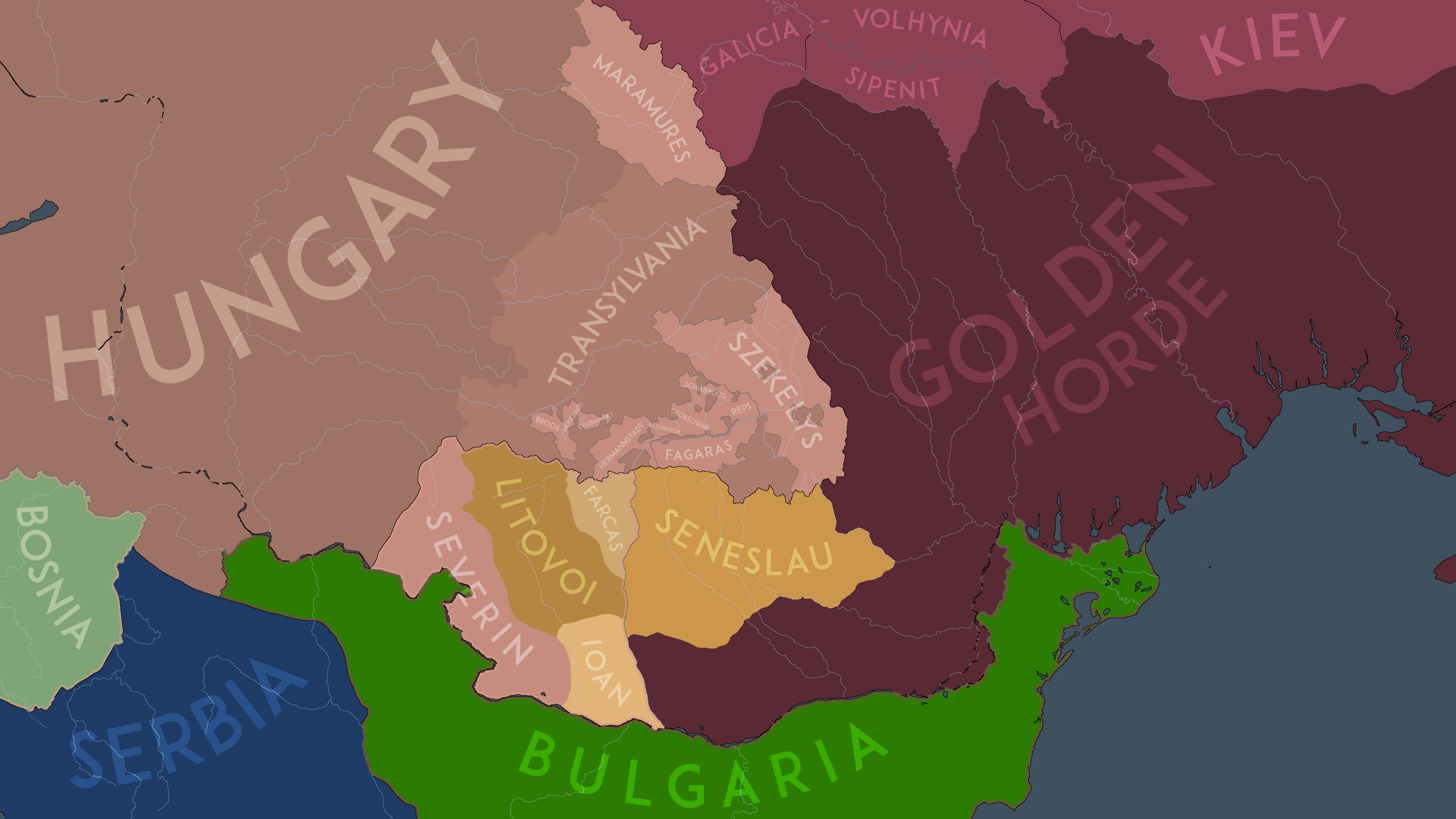
- Romanian state formations in 1246; Țara Litua shown as "Litovoi"
- Status: Independent state (1247–1279); Hungarian vassal (1279–1330)
- Capital: Câmpulung, Curtea de Argeș
- Common languages: Romanian; Slavic; Cuman; German
- Religion: Eastern Orthodox
- Government: Absolute monarchy
- Voivode
  - fl. 1241: Bezerenbam
  - c. 1247–1279: Litovoi
  - 1279–1290: Bărbat
  - 1290–1310: Thocomerius
  - 1310–1330: Basarab
- Historical era: Middle Ages
Succeeded by
Wallachia
- Today part of: Romania

Țara Litua (lit. 'the Litua Country') was a country from around Severin to the Olt River. The first mention of the country was in 1247, when Litovoi was its voivode.

Likely established as a voivodate in the early 13th century, Țara Litua resisted Hungarian influence until 1279. After the death of Litovoi in a battle against Hungarians around 1279, his successor, Bărbat, was captured and forced to accept Hungarian suzerainty. This status persisted until 1330, when Basarab secured independence following his decisive victory at the Battle of Posada. After this event, Romanian historiography generally identifies Țara Litua as part of the newly founded state of Wallachia.

== History ==
=== Creation ===
Bezerenbam (in an Arabic rendering of his otherwise unknown name) is the earliest possible ruler of Țara Litua. He was mentioned by Rashid al-Din Hamadani in Jami' al-tawarikh (1241), described as the ruler of Ilaut (Oltenia) and defeated by the Mongols alongside Mișelav. Some historians (such as Alexandru D. Xenopol and Bogdan Petriceicu Hasdeu) consider the name to be a distorted form of "Basarab the Ban". Xenopol, in particular, believes that Bezerenbam was the same person as Litovoi. Constantin C. Giurescu believes that the name is a distorted form of the title of Ban of Severin (Latin: Terra Zeurino), instead. Other historians believe Bezerenbam to be a predecessor of Litovoi.

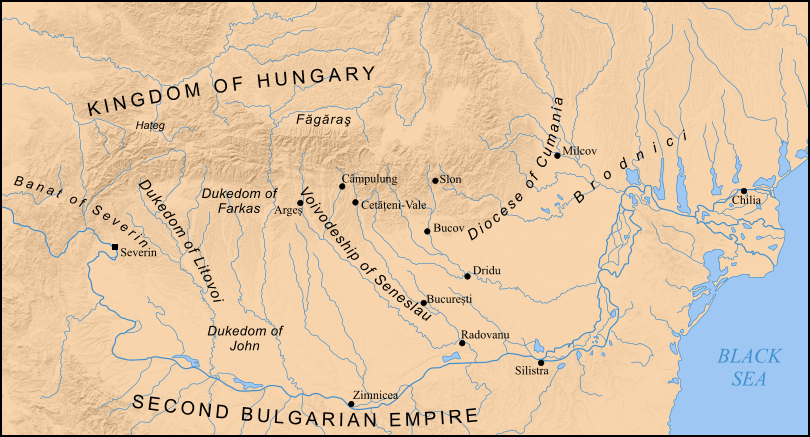
Probable location of polities described in the Diploma of the Joannites, circa 1247

=== War with the Hungarians ===
Litovoi is the earliest recorded voivode of Țara Litua, as mentioned by the Diploma of the Joannites. It granted territories to the Knights Hospitaller in Severin and Cumania, “with the exception of the land of the kenazate of Voivode Litovoi,” which the king left to the Vlachs “as they had held it”. The diploma also refers to knezes Farcaș and John, and also a voivode called Seneslau. It seems that Litovoi was the most powerful of all the above rulers, as his territories were exempted from the grant to the knights. Although the name of Litovoi has a Slavic origin, he is expressly said to be a Vlach in the king's diploma. According to the Romanian historian Ioan-Aurel Pop, king Béla IV of Hungary (1235–1290) had grabbed Hațeg from Litovoi shortly before 1247.

In 1277, Litovoi was at war with the Hungarians over lands king Ladislaus IV of Hungary (1272–1290) claimed for the crown, but for which Litovoi refused to pay tribute. In 1279, Litovoi was killed in battle, as mentioned in the king’s letter of grant on 8 January 1285, in which king Ladislaus IV donated villages in Sáros County to Master George, son of Simon, who had been sent against Litovoi. Ioan-Aurel Pop argues that the Litovoi mentioned in the diploma of 1247 was not the same person as the Litovoi whose death is described in the letter of grant of 1285, and the latter was probably the former’s successor. The same letter of grant mentions that Litovoi's brother and successor, Bărbat was taken prisoner and sent to the royal court where he was forced not only to pay ransom but also to recognise Hungarian rule. After Bărbat accepted Hungarian suzerainty, he returned to his country.

=== Hungarian suzerainty ===
The son and successor of Bărbat, Thocomerius started his rule in 1290. Historians Constantin C. Giurescu and Ioan-Aurel Pop associate the name with the Slavic "Tihomir", while Neagu Djuvara associates the name with the Cuman "Toq-tämir". His identity is controversial, as his name is only mentioned once in historical sources, in a diploma issued in 1332 by Charles I of Hungary, as the father of Basarab: "the schismatic Basarab, son of Thocomerius, our disloyal Vlach" ("Basarab, filium Thocomerii, scismaticum, infidelis Olahus Nostris"). Historians such as Constantin C. Giurescu and, notably, Neagu Djuvara, consider Thocomerius to be the same person as Radu Negru, while Ioan-Aurel Pop considers Thocomerius to be his predecessor, whom also writes that both revolted several times against Hungarian suzerainty.

=== War for independence ===
Basarab succeeded his father sometime before 1324, when Charles I of Hungary referred to him as "our voivode of Wallachia". A royal charter dating from 18 june 1325 describes Basarab as "disloyal to the Holy Crown of Hungary", showing that he had betrayed the king. Another royal charter dating from 1329 listed Basarab, along with the Bulgarians, Serbs and Tatars. In 1330, Michael Shishman of Bulgaria attacked Serbia, being accompanied by Vlachs, who, according to a letter written by Stefan Dušan in 1331, were led by Basarab. The war was lost by the Bulgarians at the Battle of Velbazhd, and Charles I, taking advantage of Basarab's weakened allies, decided to restore his suzerainty over Wallachia. The king invaded Severin Fortress and appointed a Ban of Severin in September 1330. According to the Illuminated Chronicle, Basarab offered 7.000 marks of silver as compensation, along with a yearly tribute to the king, and sending one his sons to the royal court in Visegrád. Charles I refused, and continued his campaign, with him and his soldiers facing hunger, as they were travelling through a sparsely populated region towards Curtea de Argeș. Afterwards, the king was compelled to sign an armistice, and he started retreating to Hungary. However, on 9 November, Basarab and his army ambushed the Hungarians in the Battle of Posada, somewhere in the Southern Carpathians. Standing on the cliffs above the battle, the Wallachians shot arrows and threw rocks at the army below. The Hungarian army was decimated, and the king narrowly escaped.

== Rulers ==
Name	Reign
Bezerenbam	fl. 1241
Litovoi	fl. 1247–1279
Bărbat	1279–1290
Thocomerius	1290–1310
Basarab	1310–1352

== Bibliography ==
- Djuvara, Neagu (2013), O scurtă istorie ilustrată a românilor ['A Short Illustrated History of the Romanians'), Bucharest: Editura Humanitas
