= Founding of Wallachia =

Aspect of Romanian history

The founding of Wallachia (Romanian: descălecatul Țării Românești), that is the establishment of the first independent Romanian principality, was achieved at the beginning of the 14th century, through the unification of smaller political units that had existed between the Carpathian Mountains, and the Rivers Danube, Siret and Milcov.

Prior to the consolidation of Wallachia, waves of nomadic peoples – the last of them being the Cumans and the Mongols – rode across the territory. The territory became a frontier area between the Golden Horde (the westernmost part of the Mongol Empire) and the Kingdom of Hungary after 1242. The Romanians in Muntenia, east of the Olt River, had to pay tribute to the Mongols; and west of the river, in Oltenia, they were oppressed by the Bans of Severin, appointed by the Kings of Hungary. The Golden Horde's domination decreased in the region at the end of the 13th century, and at that time the Kingdom of Hungary also underwent a strong political crisis. These events enabled the incipient states of the territory to consolidate their autonomy.

One Romanian tradition records that Wallachia was founded when a certain Radu Negru (‘Radu the Black’) arrived from the Făgăraș region in the 1290s after crossing the Transylvanian Alps with "a great many following him". Jean W. Sedlar wrote that "more credible" is the report that some Romanian lords in the Olt and Argeș valleys chose as leader one of their number, a certain Basarab.

It was Voivode Basarab I (c. 1310–1352) who broke off with the Kingdom of Hungary and refused to accept the king's suzerainty. Basarab I received international support and the recognition of the autonomy of Wallachia due to his great military victory over King Charles I of Hungary (1301–1342) at Posada on November 12, 1330. The Metropolitan See of Wallachia, directly subordinated to the Ecumenical Patriarchate of Constantinople, was set up during the reign of Basarab I's son, Nicolae Alexandru (1352–1364). The first silver and bronze coins were minted in Wallachia in 1365.

== Last centuries of the Early Middle Ages ==
Among the oldest attestations of the countries of the Vlachs (early Romanians) on the left side of the Danube, there is a quotation of a passage from an Armenian book of geography. The passage represents an interpolation, probably from the first centuries of the second millennium, which refers to an "unknown country called Balak", situated in the neighborhood of the "Sarmatians’ country" and of "Zagura" (Bulgaria). Another 11th-century reference to the Vlachs’ country appears to be the section of the ancient Turkic chronicle Oghuzname ('Oghuz Khan's Tale'), preserved in a 17th-century text, which narrates the battles of the Cumans against several peoples, including the Vlachs (Ulak).

The Cumans, a Turkic tribe approached the Danube Delta shortly after 1064–1065, and from 1068 the entire territory between the Aral Sea and the lower Danube were controlled by them. But this vast territory was never politically united by a strong central power. The different Cuman groups were under independent rulers or khans who meddled in the political life of the surrounding areas, such as the Rus’ principalities and the Byzantine Empire. In attacking the Byzantine Empire, the Cumans were also assisted by the Vlachs living in the Balkan Mountains (now in Bulgaria) who showed them the mountain paths where no imperial guard was set up.

In 1185, the Balkan Vlachs, together with the Bulgarians, rose up in arms against the Byzantine Empire. They created, with the help of the Cumans and the Vlachs living on the left bank of the Danube, a new state, the Second Bulgarian Empire between the Balkan Mountains and the Danube (to the south of the future Wallachia). The new state was called "Bulgaria and Vlachia" in Western sources. For example, in 1204 the pope elevated the head of the Bulgarian church to the rank of "primas" (primate) "of all Bulgaria and Vlachia". Vlachia as an exonym for northern Bulgaria only disappeared from the sources after the middle of the 13th century.

In 1211, King Andrew II of Hungary (1205–1235) settled the Teutonic Knights in the region of Brașov in order to put an end to the frequent incursions of the Cumans into Transylvania. The knights were given all the territory they could conquer beyond the Carpathian Mountains as a fief to be held from the king of Hungary. According to a royal charter of 1222, the knights’ military power stretched across the Carpathians all the way to the Danube. That the Teutonic Knights won several victories "beyond the snowy mountains" (ultra montes nivium), that is to the south and to the east of the Carpathians, is also confirmed by papal letters. However, the Teutonic Knights were forced out of the territory in 1225 by King Andrew II, who claimed that they had ignored his authority.

The Mongols entered Europe in 1223 when they defeated a joint Rus’-Cuman army at the river Kalka (now in Ukraine). Some Cuman groups, after their defeat of the Mongols, became willing to adopt Christianity. As early as 1227, one of the Cuman chieftains, Boricius subjected himself and his people to the future King Béla IV of Hungary, converted to Christianity and agreed to pay an annual tax and the tithe. The Roman Catholic Diocese of Cumania, located in northeastern Wallachia and southwestern Moldavia, was established in 1228. A significant presence of the Vlachs within the newly established bishopric is documented in the correspondence between the Hungarian crown prince and Pope Gregory IX (1227–1241), as the pope complained about Orthodox prelates active among the local Vlachs.

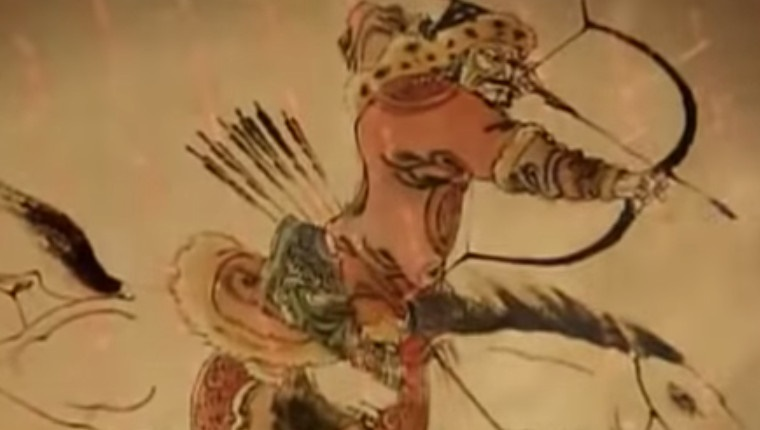
Mongol warrior on horseback, preparing a mounted archery shot

The Diocese of Cumania was de jure a part of the Kingdom of Hungary, and King Andrew II adopted the title of "king of Cumania" in 1233. There can be no doubt that the king also placed garrisons at key points on the southern slopes of the Carpathian Mountains in northeastern Wallachia. But the military outposts in the region of the bishopric are only first mentioned in relation to the Mongol invasion of 1241 by Roger of Torre Maggiore.

In parallel with the emergence of the Second Bulgarian Empire, the Kingdom of Hungary also persuaded an active expansionist policy in the Balkan Peninsula from the end of the 12th century. To that end, Oltenia was put under the control of a Hungarian governor, who received the title of ban. The centre of the new province (the Banate of Severin) was the Severin Fortress (now Drobeta-Turnu Severin, Romania), on the Danube, in the vicinity of the Iron Gates. Its first ban, Luke, was mentioned in 1233.

In 1236 a large Mongol army was collected under the supreme leadership of Batu Khan and set forth to the west, in one of the greatest invasions in world's history. The Mongols’ most devastating attacks against the western territories of the Desht-i Quipchaq (‘the steppe of the Cumans’) took place in 1237–1238. The development of the battles was not recorded in the sources, but the Cuman's subsequent migration to Hungary, Bulgaria and other neighboring territories is eloquent enough. Although some Cuman groups survived the Mongol invasion, the Cuman aristocracy was slain. The steppes of eastern Europe were conquered by Batu Khan's army and became parts of the Golden Horde.

But the Mongols left no garrisons or military detachments in the lower Danube region and did not take direct political control of it. Although theoretically part of the Golden Horde, the steppe corridor between the Dnieper River and the lower Danube was only a "region of hegemony", not of direct control.

== Earliest voivodates in medieval documents ==
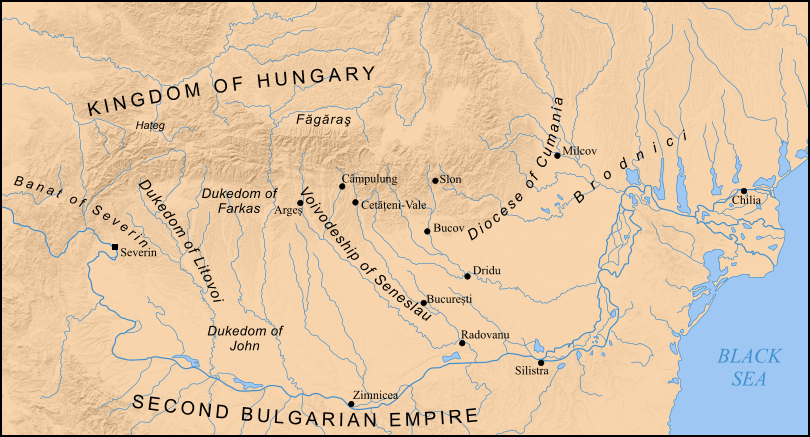
Probable political situation in the first half of the 13th century, as described in the Diploma of the Joannites

After the Mongol invasion, a great many (if not most) of the Cuman population left the Wallachian Plain, but the Vlach (Romanian) population remained there under the leadership of their local chiefs, called knezes and voivodes. In 1247, King Béla IV tried to bring the Knights Hospitallers to the region and granted to them a number of territories in the "land of Severin". The knights’ mission, however, proved to be a total failure (there is even no report whether they occupied their posts), but the royal charter for the knights, dated June 2, 1247, lists four autonomous territorial-administrative units (kenezates) in Oltenia and western Muntenia.

Two of them, the kenezates of Johannes and Farcaș were given to the Knights Hospitallers. But the voivodates under Litovoi and Seneslau were exempted from the grant, and the royal charter expressly stipulated that they were to be left "to the Vlachs as they had owned it until now". On the other hand, the royal charter also describes that Voivode Litovoi's rule had extended on the northern side of the Transylvanian Alps into the Hunedoara region, but the king removed this territory from Litovoi's authority in 1247; thenceforward Litovoi's kenezate was restricted to the Oltenian part of the Jiu valley. Voivode Seneslau held the territories of central and southern Muntenia on the banks of the rivers Argeș and Dâmbovița.

After the failure and disappearance of the Hospitallers, the history of the region is shrouded in obscurity for decades. But the trend toward the unification of the Romanian polities seems to begin with Voivode Litovoi. He (or his namesake son) was at war with the Hungarians and killed in battle sometime between 1270 and 1280. In the battle, his brother, Bărbat was captured. Bărbat was forced not only to pay ransom but also to recognize Hungarian rule.

== 'Dismounting' by Radu Negru ==
Romanian chronicles written in the 17th century narrate that a herțeg or duke of Făgăraș and Almaș, named Radu Negru (‘Radu the Black’) or Negru Vodă (‘The Black Voivode’) was the first voivode of Wallachia. These texts state that Radu Negru, together with some colonists ("Romanians, Catholics and Saxons") arrived from the region of Făgăraş in Transylvania. The first documentary evidence for a terra Blacorum (‘land of the Vlachs’) on the territory later called Făgăraș is an early 13th-century property register which mentions the order of King Andrew II of Hungary that estates previously in Vlach hands be transferred to the Cistercian abbey at Cârța. Radu Negru and his followers crossed the Carpathians to Muntenia and founded Wallachia with its capitals in Câmpulung and Curtea de Argeș. The chronicles narrate these events under the year 1290 or 1292.

The Romanian term for the "founding" (descălecat, literally ‘dismounting’) refers to this alleged settling in Wallachia. But the word's exact meaning is debated, since there had been Romanians living in Wallachia before Radu Negru's arrival; thus the term likely refers simply to the unification of the lands under one ruler. Moreover, this account of Radu Negru's ‘dismounting’ may merely be a legend subsequently invented to parallel the circumstances by which Moldavia, the other Romanian principality was founded according to the earliest chronicles.

The origin of Oltenia is given by some of the chronicles differently: according to these chronicles Oltenia was colonized by Romanians from Turnu Severin, who founded two other capitals, at Strehaia and Craiova. After the arrival of Radu Negru and his descălecat, these Romanians swore allegiance to him.

Radu Negru's personality is surrounded by legend; no details about him can be proved by other historical sources. Some chronicles identify him with the founder of various churches, such as the monastery at Curtea de Argeș, but they mistake him for later voivodes of Wallachia, such as Radu I (c. 1377–c. 1383) and Neagoe Basarab (1512–1521).

Due to lack of any actual contemporary evidence, the Roman historian Nicolae Iorga doubted the existence of such a voivode, considering that 'Negru Vodă' is simply a nickname that could have been given to Basarab I, the real founder of Wallachia. Other view is represented by Neagu Djuvara who identifies Negru Vodă with Thocomerius, Basarab's father, explaining his nickname by his alleged Cuman descent: he appeared to have a dark skin color for the Romanians. In an interview, historian Ioan-Aurel Pop stated, Djuvara "is not a specialist in the field of medieval history" and his "Cumanian theory" is questionable.

The legendary traditions may also be in connection with the establishment of a trans-Carpathian frontier mark by the Hungarian monarchy, with its capital at Câmpulung, probably in the last decade of the 13th century. A tomb stone belonging to one of the leaders of this formation, Count Lawrence of Câmpulung (comes Laurentius de Longo Campo), dating from the year 1300, may provide a solid chronological reference point. On the other hand, comes Laurentius may have been a one-time leader of the Saxon community in Câmpulung.

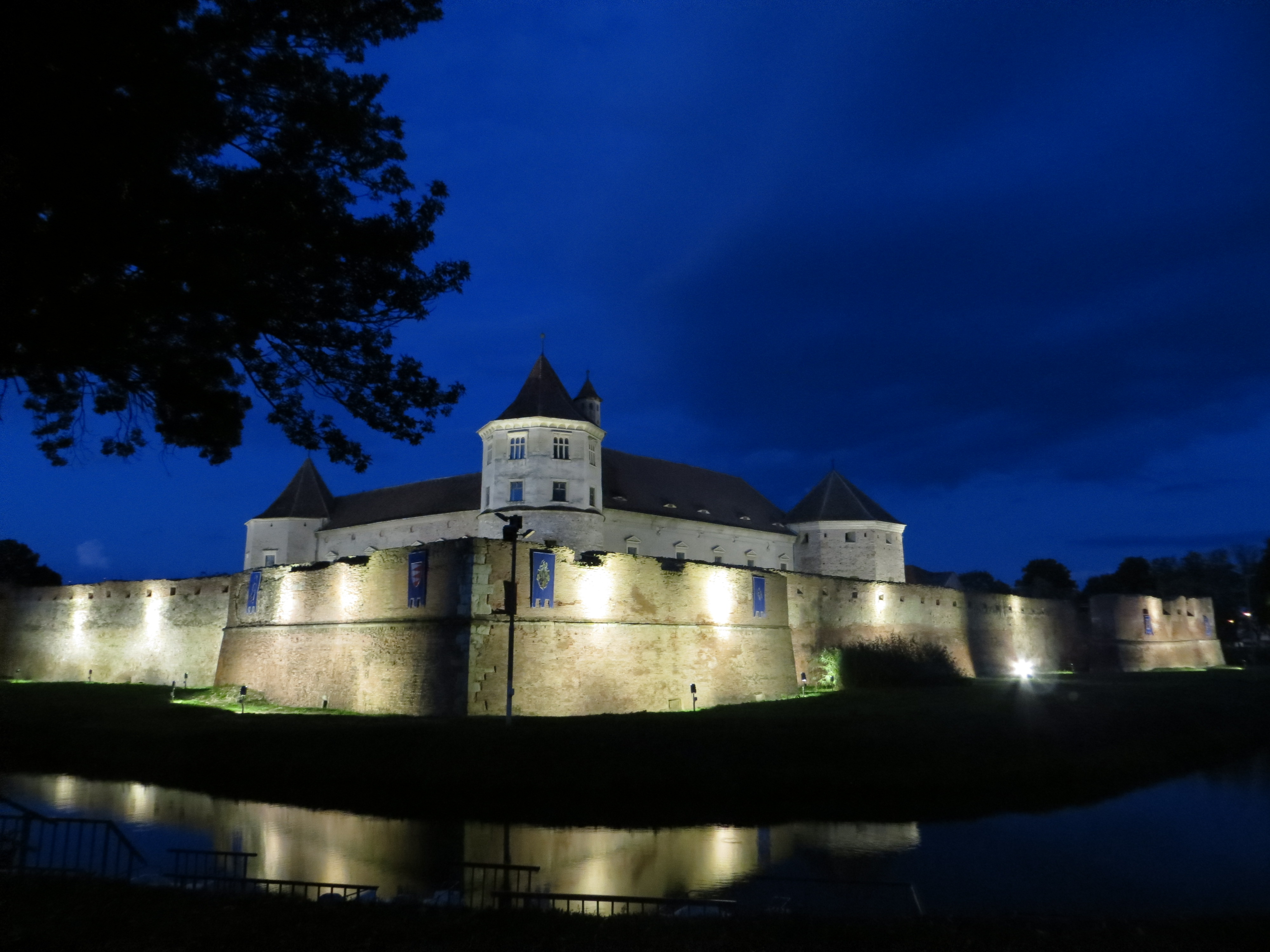
Făgăraș Castle (Hungarian: Fogaras, German: Fogarasch)

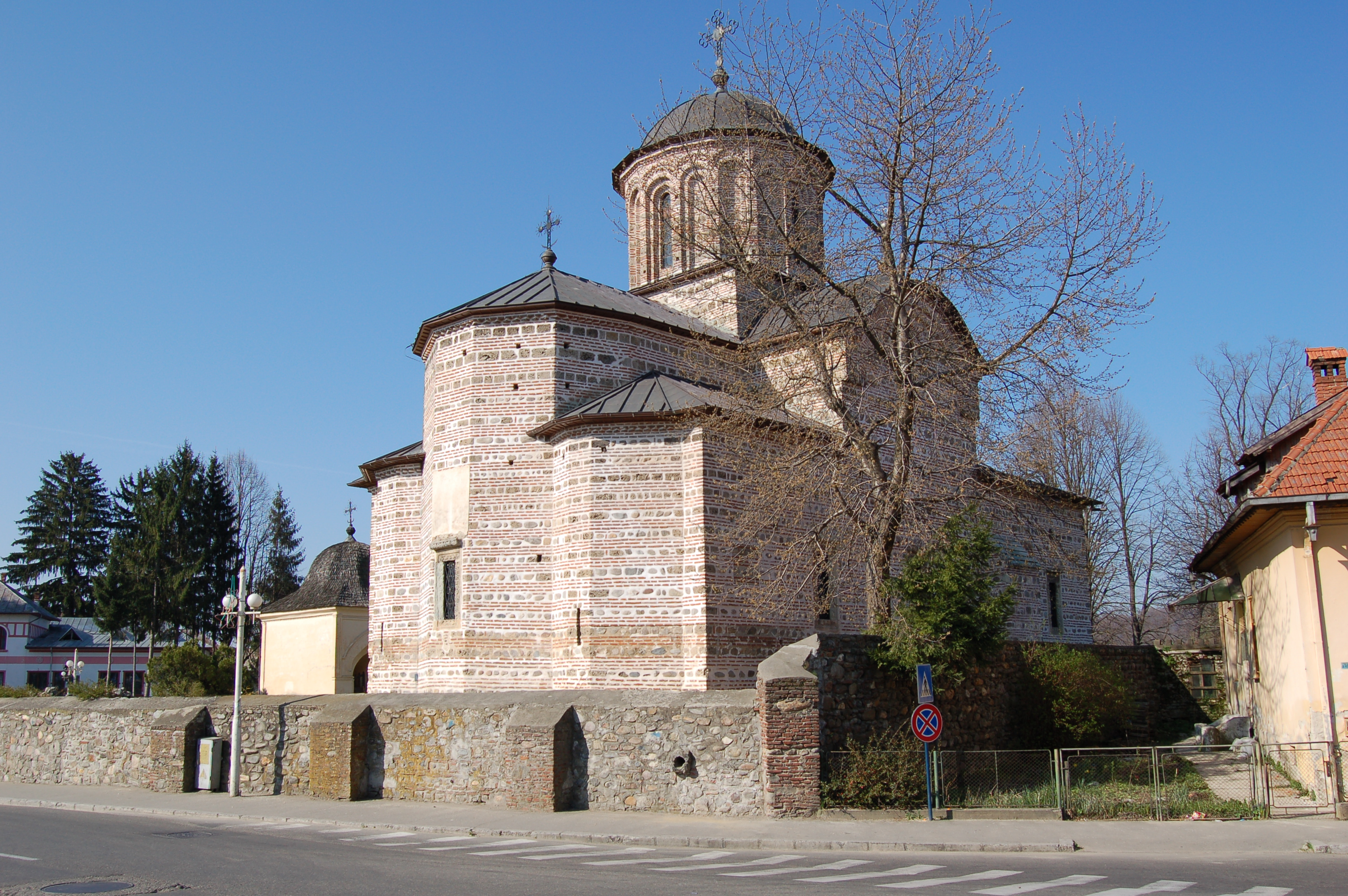
The Princely Church in Curtea de Argeş

History of Wallachia from the time when the Orthodox Christians dismounted there

But earlier the Romanians arrived who had separated from the Romans and wandered to the north. With their chiefs Trajan and with his son-in-law Siverie. Having crossed the waters of the Danube, they dismounted at Turnu Severin, others in Hungary, by the waters of the Olt, by the waters of the Mureș and by the waters of the Tisa, reaching as far as Maramureș. Those who had dismounted at Turnu Severin spread all along the foot of the mountains towards the waters of the Olt; others went downward all along the Danube. Having this way all the places been filled with them, they arrived as far as the outskirts of Nicopolis. Then the boyars, who are of noble families, gathered. In order to have their own leaders (that is great bans), a family, named Basarab, was appointed to the banship. The first seat was decided to be at Turnu Severin, the second seat to be set up farther, at Strehaia, and the third seat to be set up even farther, at Craiova; and it happened like that. Much time went by and they were governing that region..

In 6798 AM, there was a voievode in Hungary, called Voievod Radu the Black, great duke of Almaș and Făgăraș. He set out from there, together with his whole household and with many other people, Romanians, papists, Saxons, and all kind of men. They descended towards the waters of Dâmbovița, starting this way to establish a new country. First they founded the town called Câmpulung where a large, beautiful and lofty church was built. Afterwards, they settled at Argeş where another large town was founded. By building stone castles, princely houses and a large and beautiful church, the prince's seat was also established there. Some of the people, who had come down together with him, went farther along the foothills as far as the waters of the Siret and towards Brăila. Others went downward establishing towns and villages, and they reached all the places as far as the banks of the Danube and all along the Olt.

— Cantacuzino Chronicle

In 6798 AM, there was a voievode called Voievod Radu the Black, who had his seat at Făgăraș from the fathers and forefathers of the Romanians who had come from Rome, in the days of Emperor Trajan decided to move his seat on the other side [of the Carpathians] – Chronicle of Radu Popescu (Cronica Balenilor)

== Basarab I the Founder ==
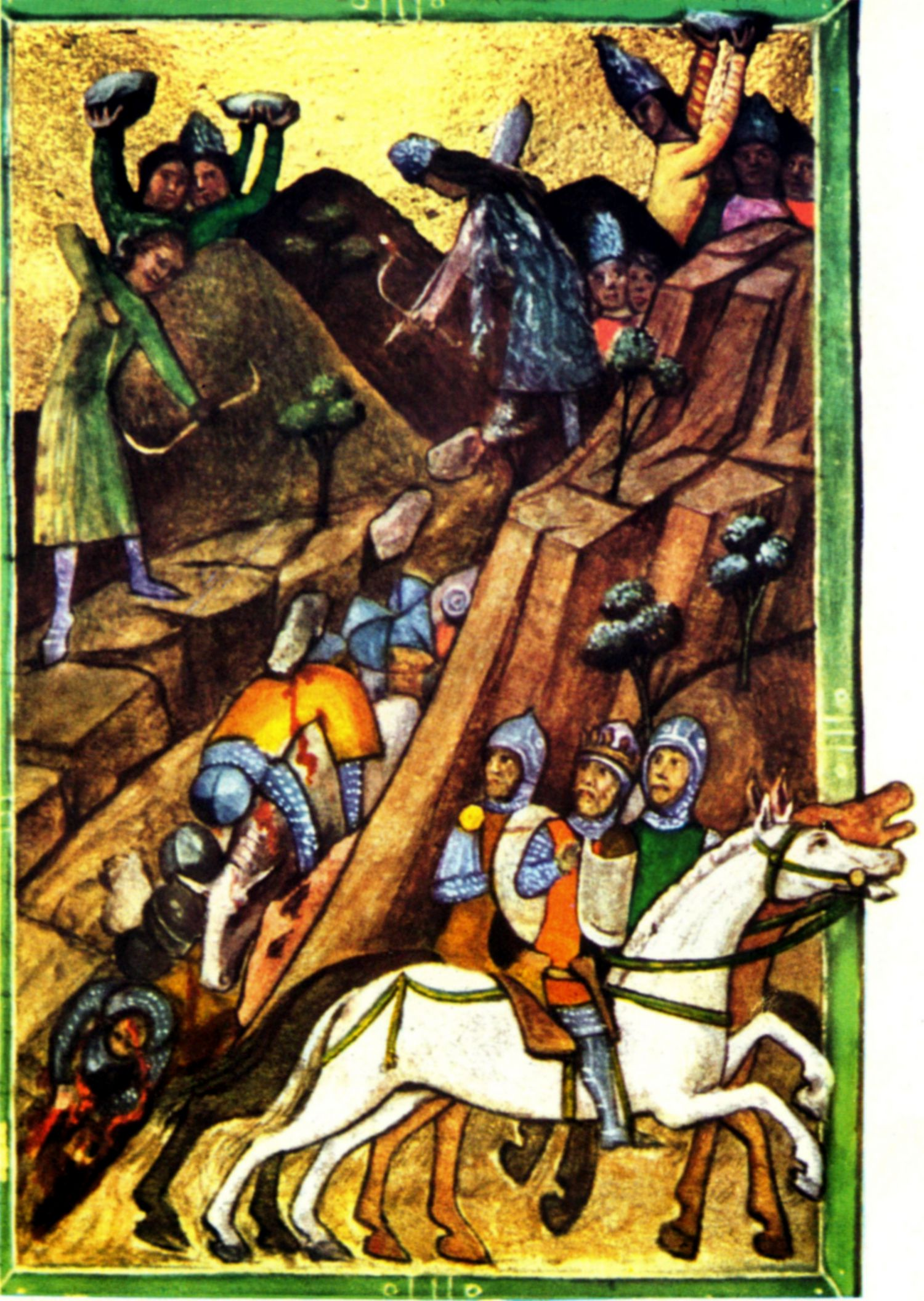
The Battle of Posada in the Chronicon Pictum

Basarab was the son of Thocomerius whose status cannot be specified. There is no direct clue in the sources to the date when Basarab took the office of voivode. But Ioannes Kantakouzenos in his History narrates that in 1323 Basarab's armies joined in the fighting between Bulgaria and Byzantium and supported Tzar Michael Šišman of Bulgaria (1323–1330) against the Byzantines. In a diploma, dated July 26, 1324, King Charles I of Hungary refers to Basarab as "our voivode of Wallachia" (woiuodam nostrum Transalpinum) which indicates that at that time Basarab was a vassal of the king of Hungary.

In short time, however, Basarab refused to accept the suzerainty of the king, for neither Basarab's growing power nor the active foreign policy he was conducting on his own account to the south could be acceptable in Hungary. In a new diploma, dated June 18, 1325, King Charles I mentions him as "Basarab of Wallachia, unfaithful to the king's Holy Crown" (Bazarab Transalpinum regie corone infidelem).

Hoping to punish Basarab, King Charles I mounted a military campaign against him in 1330. The king marched to Severin and took it from Basarab. The voivode asked for a truce, offering to refund 7,000 silver marks for the costs of the army, and showed himself ready to continue paying tribute to the king and send his son as a hostage to the royal court. But the king refused and advanced with his host into Wallachia where everything seemed to have been laid waste.

Unable to subdue Basarab, the king ordered the retreat through the mountains. But in a long and narrow valley, the Hungarian army was attacked by the Romanians, who had taken up positions on the heights. The battle, called the Battle of Posada, lasted for four days (November 9–12, 1330) and was a disaster for the Hungarians whose defeat was devastating. The king was only able to escape with his life by exchanging his royal coat of arms with one of his retainers.

The Battle of Posada was a turning point in Hungarian-Wallachian relations: though in the course of the 14th century, the kings of Hungary still tried to regulate the voivodes of Wallachia more than one time, but they could only succeed temporarily. Thus Basarab's victory irretrievably opened the way to independence for the Principality of Wallachia.

== Aftermath of the Battle of Posada ==
The international prestige of Wallachia increased considerably after Basarab's victory over King Charles I. Only a few months after his great victory, in February 1331, Basarab contributed to the establishment of his son-in-law, Ivan Alexander (1331–1371) on the throne of the tzars of Bulgaria in Tarnovo.

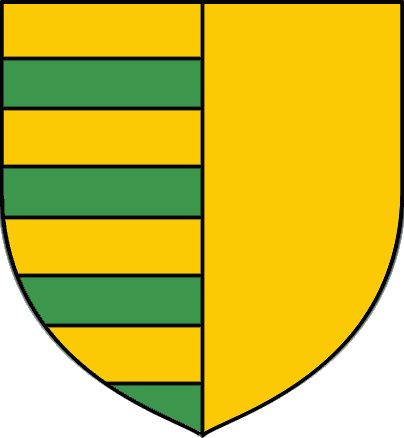
14th century coat of arms of Wallachia, used during the rule of the Basarab royal dynasty

As a way of solemnizing his secession from the Kingdom of Hungary, Basarab's son, Nicolae Alexandru also sought Byzantine approval for the creation of an Orthodox see for his territories. In 1359 Byzantium acceded to his request that the displaced metropolitan of Vicina, Hyakinthos – whom Nicolae Alexander had been hosting at his court for some time – should become the "legitimate pastor of all Oungrovlachia for the blessing and spiritual direction of himself, his children and all his lordship". At the same time, Byzantium also agreed to the creation of a metropolitan see, after Hyakinthos’ death, for "all Oungrovlachia".

The new state was denoted as Oungrovlachia (Οὐγγροβλαχία) in Byzantine sources which reflects that it bordered on the Kingdom of Hungary. This name is first encountered in a Greek diploma issued by the synod of the Patriarchate of Constantinople in 1370. In the diploma, the ruler of Wallachia, Nicolae Alexandru is styled "great voivode and master of all Oungrovlachia".

Latin documents used the term Wallachia or Wallachia maior (‘Greater Wallachia’) for Muntenia (which first appeared in 1373), and Wallachia minor (‘Lesser Wallachia’) for Oltenia (first recorded in 1377). The new country was identified as terra transalpina (‘land beyond the mountains’) or partes transalpinae (‘parts beyond the mountains’) in documents issued by the Royal Chancellery of Hungary in the entire 14th century. The terminology of the Hungarian chancellery was also used in the Latin documents of the Wallachian voivodes.

The Romanian rulers chose the Byzantine model of government, and Wallachia was from the start an absolute monarchy. The princes' absolute power was held to be divinely ordained. Their correspondence and records used the expression "By the Grace of God" from the 14th century. Wallachian sovereigns were host commanders and supreme judges, they patronized the church and made decisions that became laws. In theory, the voivodes were considered proprietors of all the lands in the country, but in fact they were devoid of extensive personal land holdings.

The monarchy was also dynastic: the princes were to be elected by boyars from among the members of the ruling family, the Basarabs. The boyars were the members of the privileged landed aristocracy. However, the origin of the Romanian boyar class is problematic: it may have evolved naturally from the heads of the Vlach villages and communities, but it is also possible that the princes created it by granting privileges to certain favored persons.

Multiple vassalage became an important aspect of Romanian diplomacy after the Christian Balkan states (Bulgaria, Serbia) one by one fell to the Ottoman Empire in the course the second half of the 14th century. For example, Mircea the Elder (1386–1418) accepted the suzerainty of Poland in 1387 and that of Hungary in 1395, and Wallachia was paying tribute to the Ottoman Empire from 1417. When accepting Hungarian suzerainty, the princes of Wallachia usually also received the district of Făgăraş in Transylvania from the Hungarian monarchs, for example in 1366 King Louis I of Hungary (1342–1382) granted the region to Prince Vladislav I of Wallachia (1364–1377), with the title of duke, and Prince Mircea the Elder received it from King Sigismund (1387–1437).

During the reign of Mircea the Elder, Dobruja also became part of Wallachia before it was annexed to the Ottoman Empire.

== See also ==
- Founding of Moldavia
- Balkan–Danubian culture
- Bulgarian lands across the Danube
