= Voivode (Vlach leader) =

A voivode was a leader of certain Vlach (Romanian) communities in the Kingdom of Hungary and western Balkans, during the Middle Ages.

== Terminology ==
The term voivode is of Slavic military title and roughly translates to "lead the fight" (бой водя, вое-водя, воевода) While leaders of the Vlach communities bore the title of knez both in the Balkans and the Kingdom of Hungary, the use of the title voivode is documented primarily in the lands under the rule of the Hungarian kings. Vlach voivodes were first mentioned in 1247. In that year, King Béla IV of Hungary (r. 1235–1270) granted the "region of Szörény" (modern Turnu-Severin in Romania) to the Knights Hospitaller as far as the Olt River save the lands ruled by two Vlach voivodes, Litovoi and Seneslau.

Although the duties of a voivode and of a knez sometimes overlapped, or, more often, knezes provided council to the voievode in his duties, in general the voivode retained the warlord duties associated with the meaning of the word, whereas knezes delt with the civil issues of the customary law. The situation is illustrated in the 1436 agreement between Vlachs in Cetina region and Ivan VI Frankopan.

== Romanian voivodes in the Kingdom of Hungary ==
In 1326, the comes of Csanád, Nicholaus, gifts to Diocese of Várad the property called Hudus where voivode Negul "sits and dwells" (considet et commoratur).

In 1335, Ladislaus Jánki, archbishop of Kalocsa, was facilitating under command from the king the settlement of voivode "Bogdan, son of Mykula" in the Kingdom of Hungary.

Queen Elizabeth of Bosnia allows Romanians from Bereg County to choose from among themselves a voivode, in 1364.

== See also ==
- Voivodeship of Maramureș

== Sources ==
- Bónis, György (2003). Hűbériség és rendiség a középkori magyar jogban [Vassalage and Estates in Medieval Hungarian Law] (in Hungarian). Osiris. ISBN 963-389-426-3.
- Makkai, László (1994). "The Emergence of the Estates (1172–1526)". In Köpeczi, Béla; Barta, Gábor; Bóna, István; Makkai, László; Szász, Zoltán; Borus, Judit (eds.). History of Transylvania. Akadémiai Kiadó. pp. 178–243. ISBN 963-05-6703-2.
- Nägler, Thomas (2005). "Transylvania Between 900 and 1300". In Pop, Ioan-Aurel; Nägler, Thomas (eds.). The History of Transylvania, Vol. I (Until 1541). Romanian Cultural Institute. pp. 199–231. ISBN 973-7784-00-6.
