= Basarab I of Wallachia =

First independent ruler of Wallachia (r. c. 1310–1351/52)

Basarab I the Founder
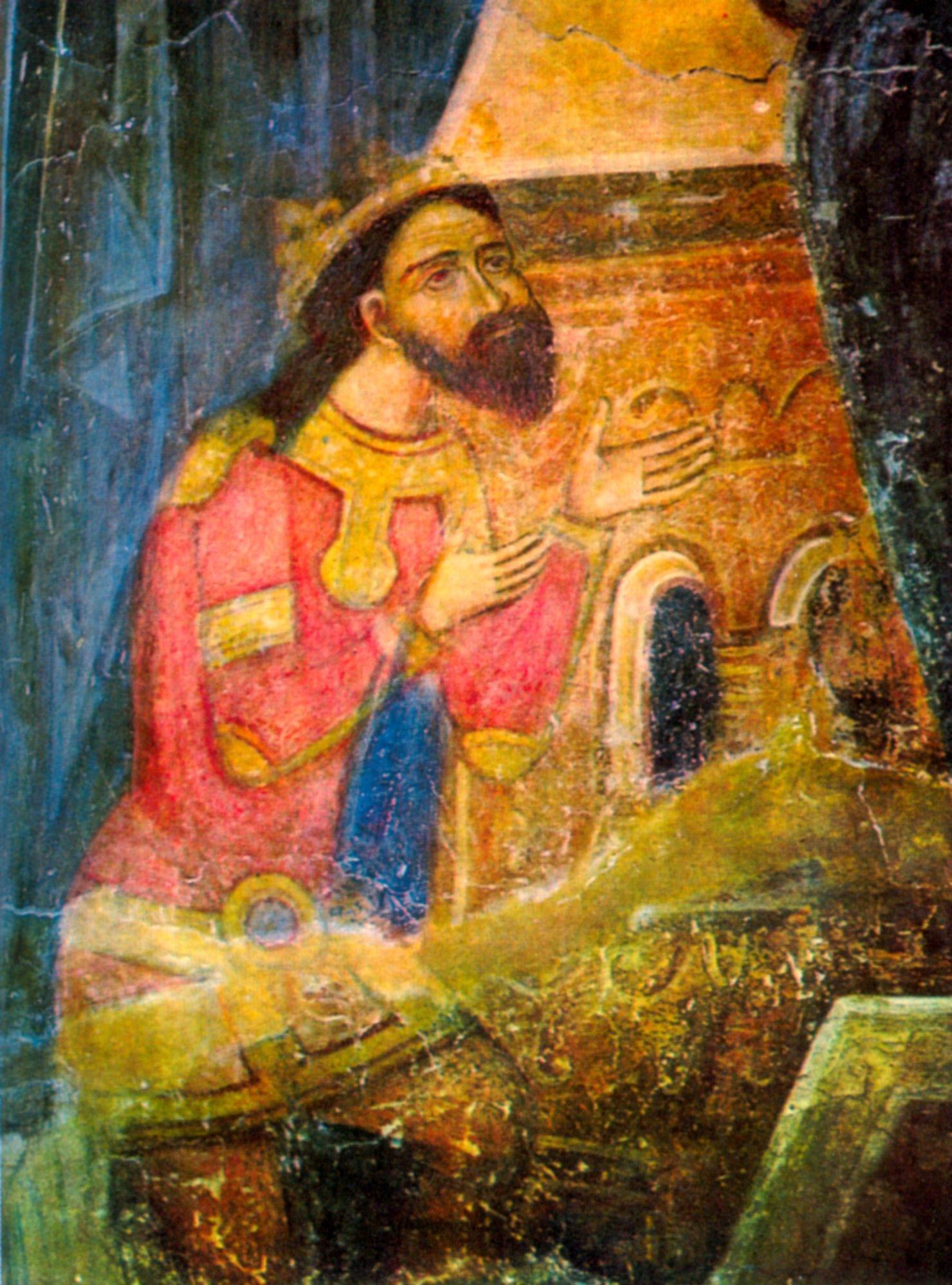
- Basarab I (fresco in Argeș)

Voivode of Wallachia
- Reign: c. 1310/between 1304 and 1324 – 1351/1352 from c. 1344 with Nicolae Alexandru
- Predecessor: Radu Negru or Thocomerius
- Successor: Nicholas Alexander of Wallachia
- Born: c. 1270
- Died: 1351 or 1352
- Spouse: Doamna Marghita (Margarete)
- Issue: Nicholas Alexander of Wallachia; Theodora of Wallachia
- Dynasty: Basarab
- Father: Radu Negru, or Thocomerius
- Religion: Eastern Orthodox

Basarab I (Romanian: [basaˈrab]), also known as Basarab the Founder (Romanian: Basarab Întemeietorul; c. 1270 – 1351/1352), was a voivode and later the first independent ruler of Wallachia who lived in the first half of the 14th century. Many details of his life are uncertain. According to two popular theories, Basarab either came into power between 1304 and 1324 by dethroning or peacefully succeeding the legendary founder of Wallachia, Radu Negru, or in 1310 by succeeding his father, Thocomerius.

A royal charter issued on 26 July 1324 is the first document to reference Basarab. According to the charter, he was subject to Charles I of Hungary as the voivode of Wallachia. Basarab became "disloyal to the Holy Crown of Hungary" in 1325. He seized the Banate of Severin and raided the southern regions of the Kingdom of Hungary. Basarab supported Michael Shishman of Bulgaria's attack against the Kingdom of Serbia, but their united armies were defeated in the Battle of Velbazhd on 28 July 1330. Soon after, Charles I of Hungary invaded Wallachia, but the Wallachians ambushed the royal troops in the Battle of Posada, between the 9 and 12 November 1330, nearly annihilating the entire force, subsequently ending Hungarian suzerainty in Wallachia, allowing the foundation of the first independent Romanian principality. Basarab's descendants ruled Wallachia for at least two centuries. The region of Bessarabia, situated between the rivers Dniester and Prut, was named for the Basarab dynasty.

== Origins ==
Basarab was the son of Thocomerius, according to a charter written by Charles I of Hungary in 1332. Thocomerius' social position cannot be determined. A scholarly hypothesis states that he was descended from Seneslau, a mid-13th-century Vlach (Romanian) lord. Historian Vlad Georgescu writes that Thocomerius was the probable successor to Bărbat, the late 13th-century ruler of Oltenia. Historian Tudor Sălăgean says that Thocomerius was "a local potentate."

Basarab's name is of Turkic origin. Its first part is the present participle for the verb bas- ("press, rule, govern"); the second part matches the Turkic honorific title aba or oba ("father, elder kinsman"), which can be recognized in Cuman names, such as Terteroba, Arslanapa and Ursoba. Basarab's name implies that he was of Cuman or Pecheneg ancestry, but this hypothesis has not been proven. At least four royal charters from the 14th century refer to Basarab as a Vlach. Charles I of Hungary referred to him as "Basarab, our disloyal Vlach" in 1332.

Pope John XXII addressed Basarab as a "devout Catholic prince" in a letter written on 1 February 1327. On the same day, the pope sent similar letters to Charles I of Hungary and his high officials, including Thomas Szécsényi, the voivode of Transylvania, and Mikcs Ákos, the ban of Slavonia, asking them to support the Dominicans' actions against the "heretics". According to scholar Neagu Djuvara, this correspondence with the Holy See proves that Basarab was a Catholic, which also testifies to Basarab's Cuman origin, because the Cumans had been baptized according to Catholic rite. Historians Matei Cazacu and Dan Mureșan reject Djuvara's theory, saying that all other sources prove that Basarab was an Eastern Orthodox. For instance, the Illuminated Chronicle, completed in the late 1350s, referred to Basarab as a "perfidious schismatic."

== Reign ==
=== Charles I's voivode ===
The details of Basarab's accession are obscure. Early Romanian chronicles attribute the establishment of Wallachia to the legendary Radu Negru. According to 17th-century Wallachian chronicles, Radu Negru, after departing from Făgăraș, arrived in Wallachia in either 1290 or 1292, accompanied by "many peoples". One of those chronicles, Istoria Țării Românești, states that "Basarab" was the surname of an Oltenian boyar family, who accepted Radu Negru's suzerainty following his "dismounting". Historian Neagu Djuvara tentatively associates Basarab (or, alternatively, Basarab's father) with Radu Negru; Laurențiu Rădvan writes that Basarab either dethroned or peacefully succeeded Radu Negru between 1304 and 1324. Other historians, such as Vlad Georgescu, state that Basarab succeeded his father, Thocomerius, around 1310.

Basarab was first mentioned in a royal charter issued by Charles I of Hungary on 26 July 1324, in which he was described as "our voivode of Wallachia". This shows that Charles I regarded Basarab as a loyal vassal at that time. Historian István Vásáry states that Basarab only accepted Charles' suzerainty after the king restored royal authority in the Banate of Severin, a Hungarian border province, in 1321. In exchange for his loyalty, Basarab's possession of Severin Fort was confirmed, according to historians Tudor Sălăgean and Attila Bárány.

=== Towards independence ===
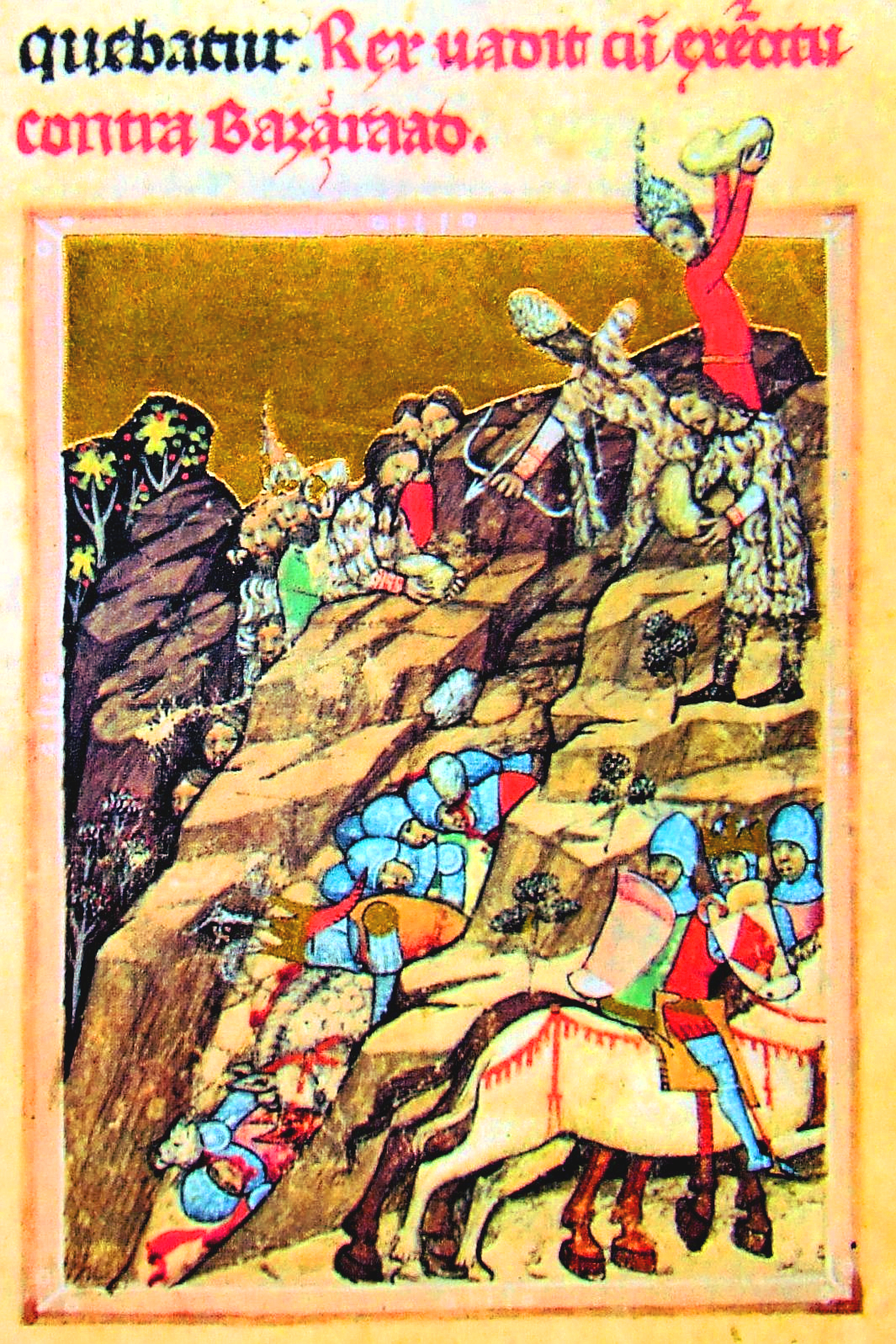
The battle of Posada (Viennese copy of Hungarian Illuminated Chronicle)

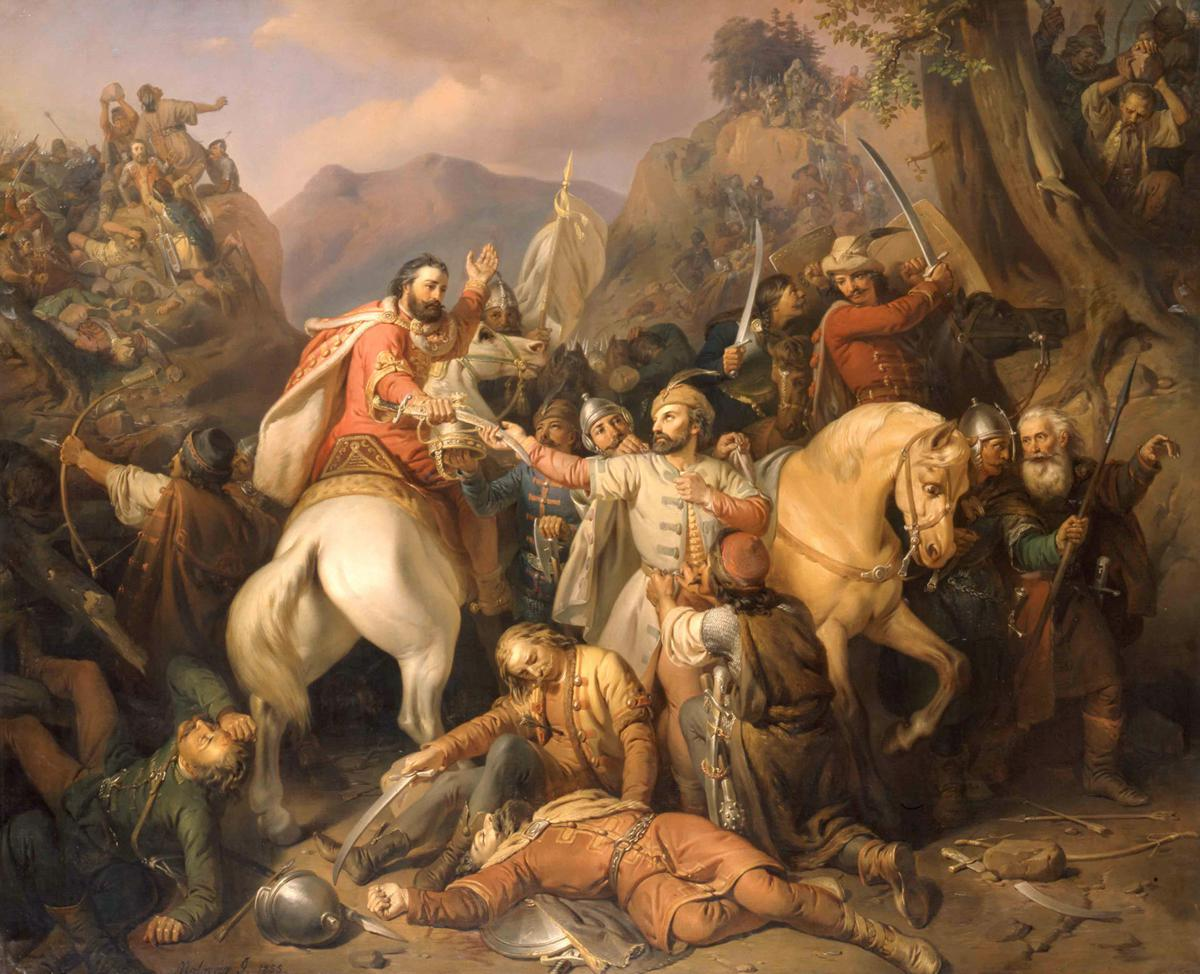
King Charles I fleeing from the Battle of Posada

A royal charter dated 18 June 1325 records that a person named Stephen, who was the son of a Cuman ispán in Hungary, stated that the king was weaker than Basarab and "did not even reach up to [his] ankle". The same charter describes Basarab as "disloyal to the Holy Crown of Hungary", showing that Basarab had betrayed the crown. A royal charter from 1329 listed Basarab, along with the Bulgarians, Serbs and Tatars, as an enemy who "[made] hostile inroads" around Mehadia. Basarab seems to have entirely controlled the Banate of Severin between 1324 and 1330, since royal charters did not mention a Ban of Severin during this period. In a letter written in 1327, Pope John XXII alluded to "territories of the Kingdom of Hungary which were subjected" to Basarab.

Michael III Shishman, Tsar of Bulgaria, attacked Serbia in 1330. He was accompanied by "the ruler of the Yas", along with Vlach and "black Tatar" auxiliary troops. According to Serbian sources and a letter written by Stephen Dušan, who became King of Serbia in 1331, Basarab personally led his army to Serbia to assist Shishman. The Serbs routed the united army of Michael Shishman and his allies at the Battle of Velbazhd on 28 July 1330. Shishman was killed while fleeing from the battlefield.

Taking advantage of the weakened state of Basarab's allies, Charles I of Hungary decided to restore his suzerainty in Wallachia. According to a royal charter issued two years after the events, Charles wanted to recapture "marginal lands" that Basarab "illegally" held in Wallachia. He invaded Oltenia, captured Severin Fort and appointed Denis Szécsi Ban of Severin in September 1330. According to the Illuminated Chronicle, Basarab offered 7,000 "marks of silver" as compensation, along with a yearly tribute to the king. He also promised to send one of his sons to the royal court in Visegrád.

However, Charles I refused Basarab's offer, saying that "[h]e is the shepherd of my sheep, and I will drag him by his beard from his lair". Charles continued his campaign, but he and his soldiers suffered from hunger while marching to Curtea de Argeș through a sparsely populated region. Charles was compelled to sign an armistice with Basarab, and the royal army started retreating from Wallachia. On 9 November, however, the Wallachians ambushed the king and his soldiers at a narrow pass in the Southern Carpathians. Standing on the cliffs above the valley, the Wallachians shot arrows and threw rocks upon the army. The battle lasted until 12 November. The royal army was decimated, and King Charles narrowly escaped. Historian Sălăgean writes that Basarab repelled Charles' invasion without assistance from his allies. A charter written in 1351 by Louis I, Charles' son and successor, states that pagan "neighbors and a troop formed of other subjects unfaithful" to Charles supported Basarab during the war, suggesting that Tatar auxiliaries fought for Basarab. However, the credibility of the report, written decades after the events, is uncertain.

=== Independent ruler ===
Archaeological research shows that after his capital of Curtea de Argeș was destroyed during Charles I's campaign, Basarab moved his seat to Câmpulung. Basarab's victory in the Battle of Posada enabled the introduction of an active foreign policy. He supported the efforts of his son-in-law, Ivan Alexander, to seize the Bulgarian crown, which he did in February 1331. With Basarab's support, Ivan Alexander successfully campaigned against the Byzantine Empire in 1331 and 1332. According to Sălăgean, Basarab allegedly took possession of Severin Fort in the early 1330s.

The reconstruction of Curtea de Argeș started after 1340, with the erection of new fortifications and a new palace. The construction of the Princely Church of Saint Nicholas in Curtea de Argeș also commenced during Basarab's rule, but it was completed after his death. Basarab seems to have made his son, Nicholas Alexander, his co-ruler around 1344. Louis I of Hungary, who had succeeded Charles I in 1342, marched to southeastern Transylvania in the summer of 1344. To prevent a campaign against Wallachia, Nicholas Alexander visited Louis I and swore loyalty to him, according to the nearly contemporaneous John of Küküllő's chronicle. Wallachian troops supported Andrew Lackfi's attack against the Mongols in 1345, according to a Wallachian chronicle, but historian Victor Spinei rejects this report. According to a charter of his grandson, Vladislav I Vlaicu, Basarab died in the year 6860 of the Byzantine calendar, which is AD 1351 or 1352.

== Family ==
A diptych from Câmpulung contains a reference to "Io Basarab voivode and his wife, Marghita". Although the diptych (which was revised and renewed in 1710) may contain a scribal error, historians tend to accept that Basarab's wife was named Marghita (from Margarete). According to Wallachian folklore, Marghita was the Catholic wife of the legendary founder of Wallachia, Radu Negru. She was told to have erected a Catholic church in Câmpulung, and committed suicide after the church was destroyed on her husband's order.

In his letter concerning the Battle of Velbazhd, Stephen Dušan mentioned that Basarab was "the father-in-law of Tsar Alexander of Bulgaria", showing that Basarab's daughter, Theodora, was Ivan Alexander of Bulgaria's wife. Historian Vásáry states that Basarab married her to Ivan Alexander around 1323 to strengthen his alliance with Bulgaria. She gave birth to children, but Ivan Alexander abandoned her and married a converted Jew, Sarah-Theodora, in the 1350s. Basarab's son and successor, Nicholas Alexander, discontinued Basarab's alliance with Bulgaria.

== Legacy ==
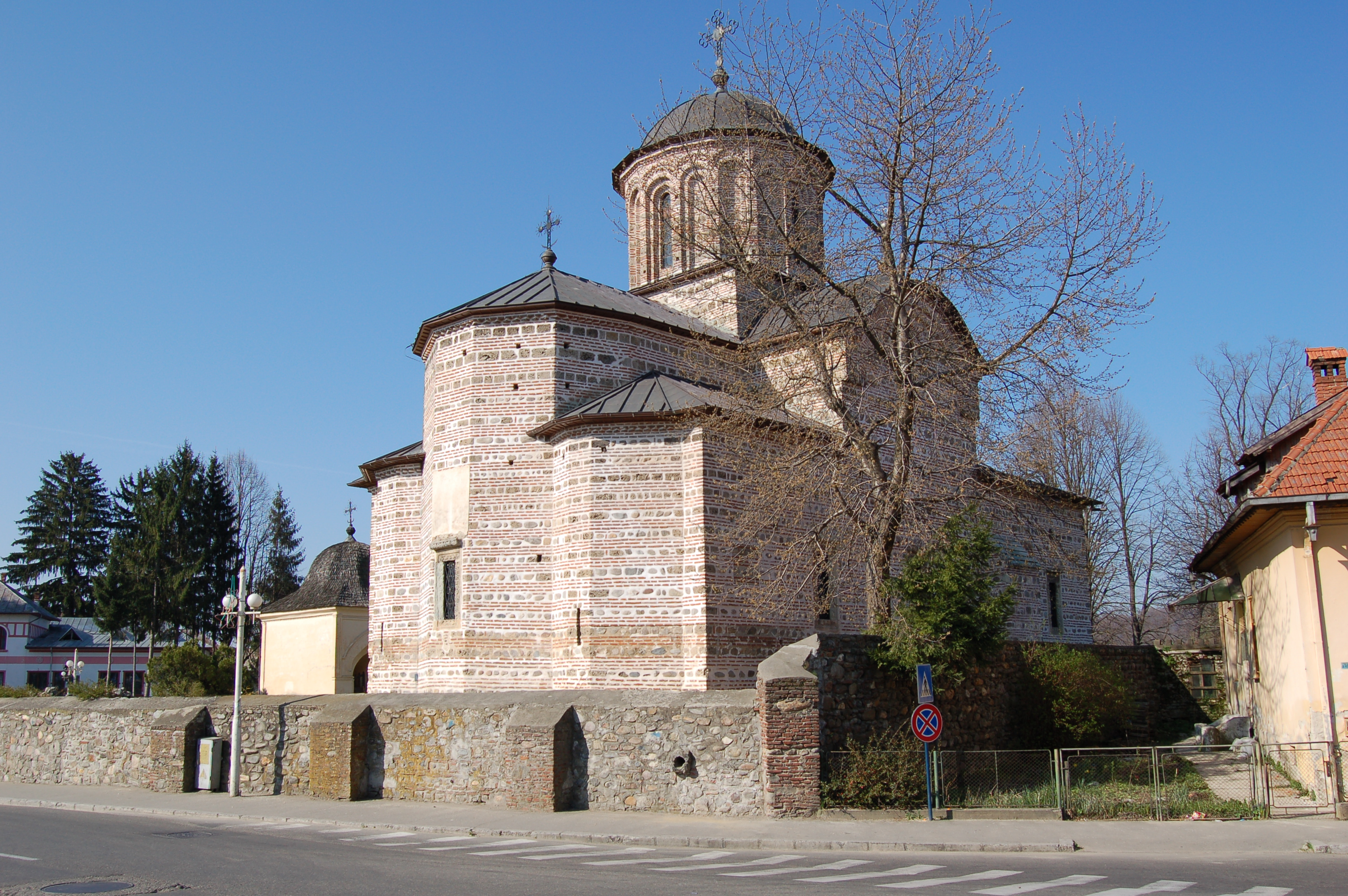
Princely Church of Saint Nicholas in Curtea de Argeș

Basarab's victory at the Battle of Posada was a turning point in the history of Wallachia. Sălăgean writes that the victory "sanctioned the independence of Wallachia from the Hungarian crown" and altered its international status. Georgescu describes Wallachia as the "first independent Romanian principality." Although the kings of Hungary continued to demand loyalty from the voivodes of Wallachia, Basarab and his successors yielded to them only temporarily in the 14th century.

The descendants of Basarab ruled Wallachia for at least two centuries. Examples of his descendants include Mircea the Old and Vlad Dracula. Neagoe Basarab, a member of the Craiovești boyar family, forged a genealogy to prove that he was a descendant of Basarab, and adopted "Basarab" as his family name after his accession in 1512.

From the middle of the 14th century, Bulgarian, Hungarian, Moldavian and Serbian chronicles used the name "Basarab" when referring to Wallachia. From the next century onward, the southern region of the land between the Dniester and Prut rivers was named Basarabia. After the Russian Empire annexed Basarabia in 1812, the region was renamed to Bessarabia. The region is now part of the Republic of Moldova.

== See also ==
- Founding of Wallachia
- Cumania
- Țara Litua

== Sources ==
=== Primary sources ===
- The Hungarian Illuminated Chronicle: Chronica de Gestis Hungarorum (Edited by Dezső Dercsényi) (1970). Corvina, Taplinger Publishing. ISBN 0-8008-4015-1.

=== Secondary sources ===
- Andreescu, Stefan (1998). "The making of the Romanian principalities". In Giurescu, Dinu C.; Fischer-Galați, Stephen (eds.). Romania: A Historic Perspective. East European Monographs. pp. 77–104. OCLC 237138831.
- Bárány, Attila (2012). "The Expansion of the Kingdom of Hungary in the Middle Ages (1000–1490)". In Berend, Nóra (ed.). The Expansion of Central Europe in the Middle Ages. Ashgate Variorum. pp. 333–380. ISBN 978-1-4094-2245-7.
- Cazacu, Matei; Mureșan, Dan Ioan (2013). Ioan Basarab, un domn român la începuturile Țării Românești [Ioan Basarab, a Romanian Prince at the Beginning of Wallachia] (in Romanian). Cartier. ISBN 978-9975-79-807-5.
- Coman, Marian (2012). "Land, lordship and the making of Wallachia". Studia Slavica et Balcanica Petropolitana. 1 (11): 79–94.
- Djuvara, Neagu (2014). A Brief Illustrated History of Romanians. Humanitas. ISBN 978-973-50-4334-6.
- Fine, John V. A. (1994). The Late Medieval Balkans: A Critical Survey from the Late Twelfth Century to the Ottoman Conquest. The University of Michigan Press. ISBN 0-472-08260-4.
- Georgescu, Vlad (1991). The Romanians: A History. Ohio State University Press. ISBN 0-8142-0511-9.
- Györffy, György (1964). "Adatok a románok XIII. századi történetéhez és a román állam kezdeteihez (II. rész)" [Data on the Romanians' history in the 13th century and the beginnings of the Romanian state]. Társadalmi Szemle (in Hungarian). 3–4 (7): 537–568.
- Hasan, Mihai Florin (2013). "Aspecte ale relațiilor matrimoniale munteano-maghiare din secolele XIV-XV [Aspects of the Hungarian-Wallachian matrimonial relations of the fourteenth and fifteenth centuries]". Revista Bistriței (in Romanian). XXVII. Cumplexul Muzeal Bistrița-Năsăud: 128–159. ISSN 1222-5096.
- Kristó, Gyula (1988). Az Anjou-kor háborúi [Wars in the Age of the Angevins] (in Hungarian). Zrínyi Kiadó. ISBN 963-326-905-9.
- Rădvan, Laurențiu (2010). At Europe's Borders: Medieval Towns in the Romanian Principalities. BRILL. ISBN 978-90-04-18010-9.
- Sălăgean, Tudor (2005). "Romanian Society in the Early Middle Ages (9th–14th Centuries AD)". In Pop, Ioan-Aurel; Bolovan, Ioan (eds.). History of Romania: Compendium. Romanian Cultural Institute (Center for Transylvanian Studies). pp. 133–207. ISBN 978-973-7784-12-4.
- Spinei, Victor (1986). Moldavia in the 11th–14th Centuries. Editura Academiei Republicii Socialiste România.
- Spinei, Victor (2009). The Romanians and the Turkic Nomads North of the Danube Delta from the Tenth to the Mid-Thirteenth century. BRILL. ISBN 978-90-04-17536-5.
- Treptow, Kurt W.; Popa, Marcel (1996). Historical Dictionary of Romania. Scarecrow Press, Inc. ISBN 0-8108-3179-1.
- Vásáry, István (2005). Cumans and Tatars: Oriental Military in the Pre-Ottoman Balkans, 1185–1365. Cambridge University Press. ISBN 0-521-83756-1.

Basarab I of Wallachia House of Basarab Died: 1351 or 1352
Regnal titles
Preceded by Thocomerius (?)	Voivode of Wallachia before 1324 – 1351 or 1352	Succeeded by Nicholas Alexander
