= Bezerenbam and Mișelav =

Wallachian leaders

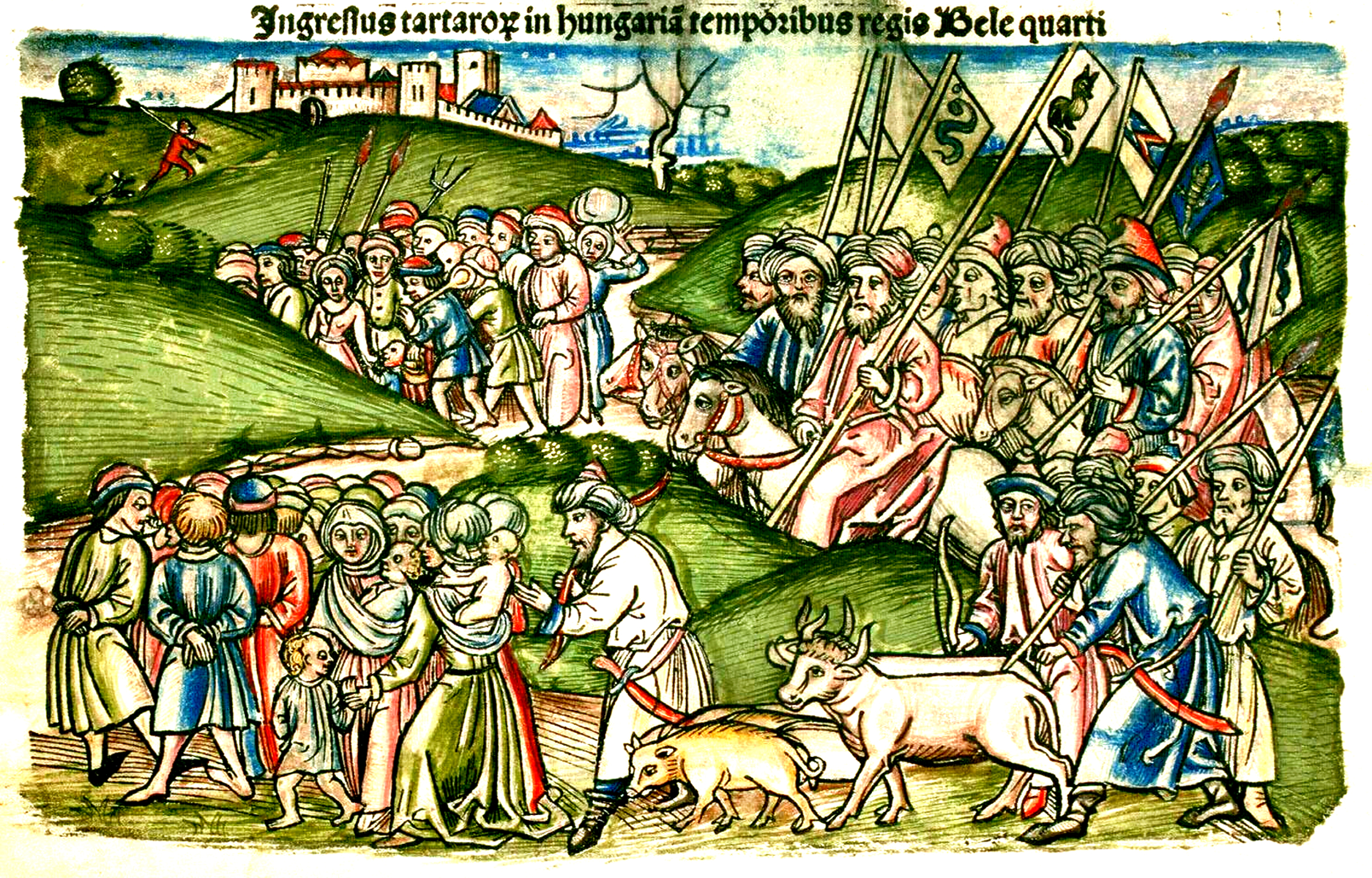
The Mongol invasion in Hungary

Bezerenbam (or Bazaram-ban) and Mișelav were the Wallachian (Romanian) leaders (the former a "ban" according to Xenopol, Hasdeu and Constantin C. Giurescu) mentioned in 1241, in the Persian chronicle Jāmiʿ al-Tawārīkh written by Rashid-al-Din Hamadani (Fazel-Ullah-Raschid). They appear in the context of the Mongol invasion of Europe. The former's army was located in Ilaut country, as the chronicle says:

In the middle of the spring (1240), the princes crossed the (...) mountains to enter in the country of Bulars and Bashguirds. Orda, who marched on the right, passing through Ilaut country, met (Bezerenbam?) with an army; the latter has been defeated. Cardan and Buri went against the Sassans, and defeated them after three battles. Budjek crossed the mountains of that country in order to enter in Cara-Ulag (Black Wallachia), defeated the Ulags (Vlachs), crossed the (...) mountains, and entered in the country of (Mișelav?), where he beat the awaiting enemy..

In his work, History of the Romanians, Alexandru D. Xenopol considers that it is possible for Bezerenbam, or Basarab the ban, to be the same person as Litovoi, mentioned in a document from 1247 as ruler of the same land. He considers Bazaram-bam is an ancestor of the Romanian dynasty of Basarab Bogdan Petriceicu Hasdeu also thinks that the leader was "Basarab the ban", a local leader, while Constantin C. Giurescu considers that this name was a distorted form of the title of Ban of Severin (Terra Zeurino).

Neagu Djuvara has considered the possibility that Mișelav was Seneslau, another Wallachian leader contemporary with and neighbouring Litovoi.

== Bibliography ==
- James Berry - Transylvania and its relations to ancient Dacia and modern Rumania
- (in Romanian) Al. Xenopol, History of the Romanians, Jassy, 1888, vol I, chapter II.2, p. 531 - 532 and chapter III.2, p. 550 - 552
- (in Romanian) Neagu Djuvara, [ Iarăşi despre Negru Vodă şi "Descălecătoare"], in "Magazin Istoric", nr. 8/2000.
- (in French) Constantin Mouradgea d'Ohsson, Histoire des Mongols depuis Tchinguiz-Khan jusqu'à Timour Bey ou Tamerlan, II, Elibron Classics, 2002, ISBN 0-543-94243-0.
- Constantin C. Giurescu, Istoria Românilor, ALL Educaţional, Bucharest, 2003.

| Preceded by Unknown | Voivode in Wallachia (before 1241) | Succeeded by (?) Litovoi |
