= Farcaș =

Cneaz mentioned in the Diploma of the Joannites

Farcaș, also Farkas, Farkaș or Farcas, was a cneaz (local chieftain or ruler) mentioned in the Diploma of the Joannites issued by king Béla IV of Hungary (1235–1270) on 2 July 1247; the diploma granted territories to the Knights Hospitaller in the Banate of Severin and Cumania. Farcaș held a kenazate which was given to the knights by the king. His kenazate lay in the northeast of modern Oltenia (in Romania).

The diploma of Béla IV also refers to the kenazates of John and voivode Litovoi and to voivode Seneslau. Seneslau and Litovoi are expressly said to be Vlachs (Olati) in the king's diploma.

Farkas (Farcaș) is a typical Hungarian name meaning ‘wolf’. The Romanian historian Ioan-Aurel Pop suggests that his name is mentioned in Hungarian translation in the diploma, and Farcaș's kenazate was one of the incipient Romanian states south of the Carpathian Mountains.

According to the Hungarian historian István Vásáry, Farcaș was either Hungarian or Romanian with Hungarian name, but the latter supposition is less probable, since Lupu, the Romanian equivalent of Hungarian Farkas, was used by the Romanians.

László Makkai proposes that the name of Vâlcea County could indicate the land of Farcaș (Slavic vlk (‘wolf’) > Vâlcea).

== See also ==
- Founding of Wallachia
- List of princes of Wallachia

== Sources ==
- Georgescu, Vlad (Author) – Calinescu, Matei (Editor) – Bley-Vroman, Alexandra (Translator): The Romanians – A History; Ohio State University Press, 1991, Columbus; ISBN 0-8142-0511-9
- Klepper, Nicolae: Romania: An Illustrated History; Hippocrene Books, 2005, New York; ISBN 0-7818-0935-5
- Makkai, László: From the Hungarian conquest to the Mongol invasion; in: Köpeczi, Béla (General Editor) – Makkai, László; Mócsy, András; Szász, Zoltán (Editors) – Barta, Gábor (Assistant Editor): History of Transylvania - Volume I: From the beginnings to 1606; Akadémiai Kiadó, 1994, Budapest; ISBN 963-05-6703-2
- Pop, Ioan-Aurel: Romanians and Romania: A Brief History; Columbia University Press, 1999, New York; ISBN 0-88033-440-1
- Rady, Martyn: Nobility, Land and Service in Medieval Hungary; Palgrave (in association with School of Slavonic and East European Studies, University College London), 2000, New York; ISBN 0-333-80085-0
- Spinei, Victor: The Romanians and the Turkic Nomads North of the Danube Delta from the Tenth to the Mid-Thirteenth Century; Brill, 2009, Leiden and Boston; ISBN 978-90-04-17536-5
- Vásáry, István: Cumans and Tatars: Oriental Military in the Pre-Ottoman Balkans, 1185-1365; Cambridge University Press, 2005, Cambridge; ISBN 0-521-83756-1
