= Litovoi =

Ruler of northern Oltenia during the 13th century

Litvoy
- Voivode
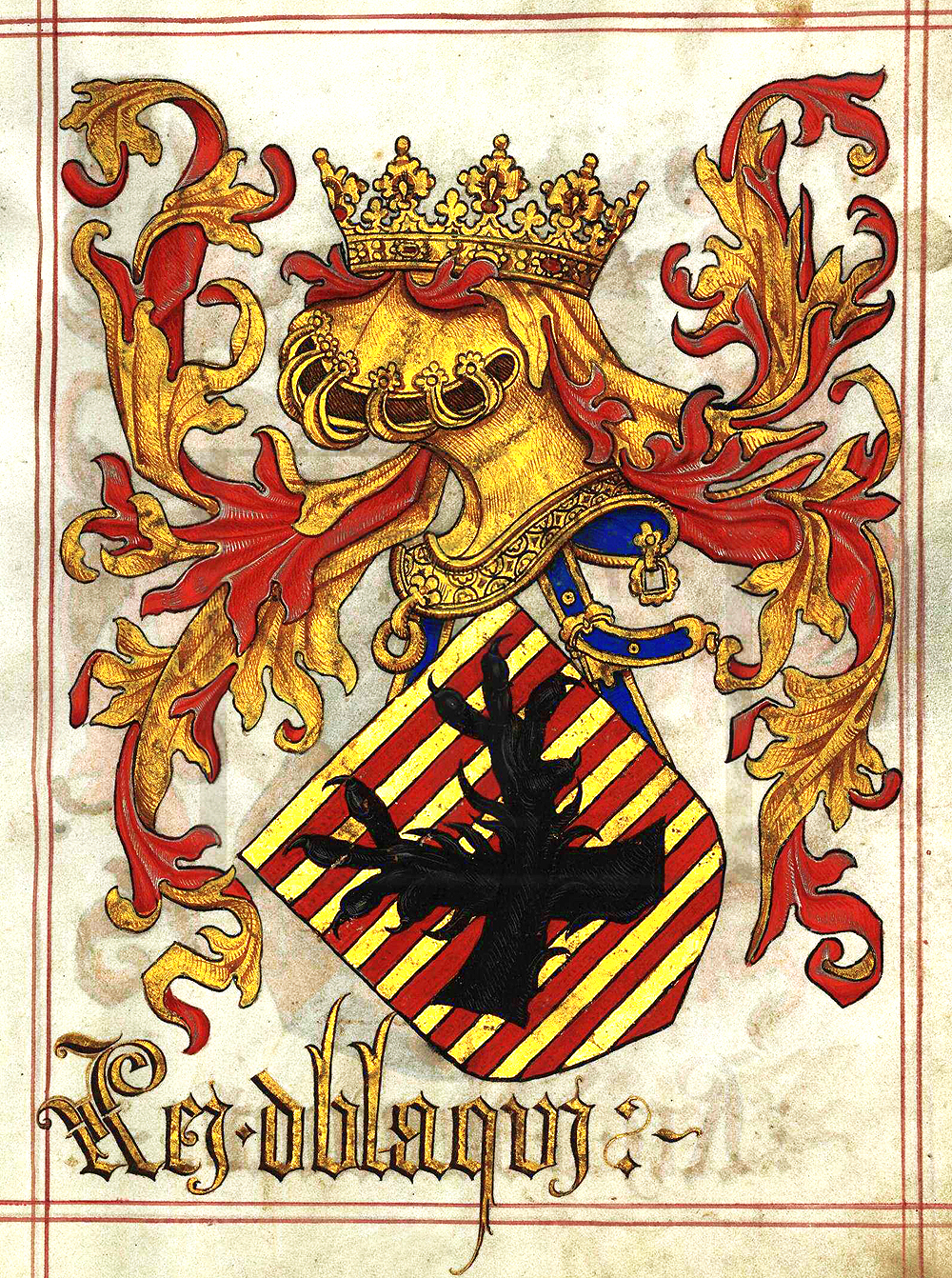
- Coat of arms of the "King of Wallachia" from Livro do Armeiro-Mor
- Reign: c. 1240-1280
- Predecessor: Bezerenbam?
- Successor: Bărbat
- Born: c. 1210
- Died: c. 1280

Litovoi, also Litvoy, was a Vlach/Romanian voivode in the 13th century whose territory comprised northern Oltenia in today's Romania.

He is mentioned for the first time in the Diploma of the Joannites issued by king Béla IV of Hungary (1235–1270) on 2 July 1247. The diploma granted territories to the Knights Hospitaller in the Banate of Severin and Cumania, “with the exception of the land of the kenazate of Voivode Litovoi,” which the king left to the Vlachs “as they had held it”.

== Name ==
The king’s diploma also refers to the kenazates of Farcaș and John and to a certain voivode Seneslau. Although the names of Litovoi and Seneslau are of Slavic origin, they are expressly said to be Vlachs (Olati) in the king's diploma. It seems that Litovoi was the most powerful of all the above local rulers. His territories were exempted from the grant to the knights, but half of the royal tax generated by his land (terra Lytua) was assigned to the Hospitallers – except for the income from the District of Hátszeg (terra Harszoc in the diploma’s only surviving, papal copy, Romanian: Țara Hațegului), which the king kept all for himself. According to the Romanian historian Ioan-Aurel Pop, the king had grabbed Haţeg from Litovoi shortly before 1247.

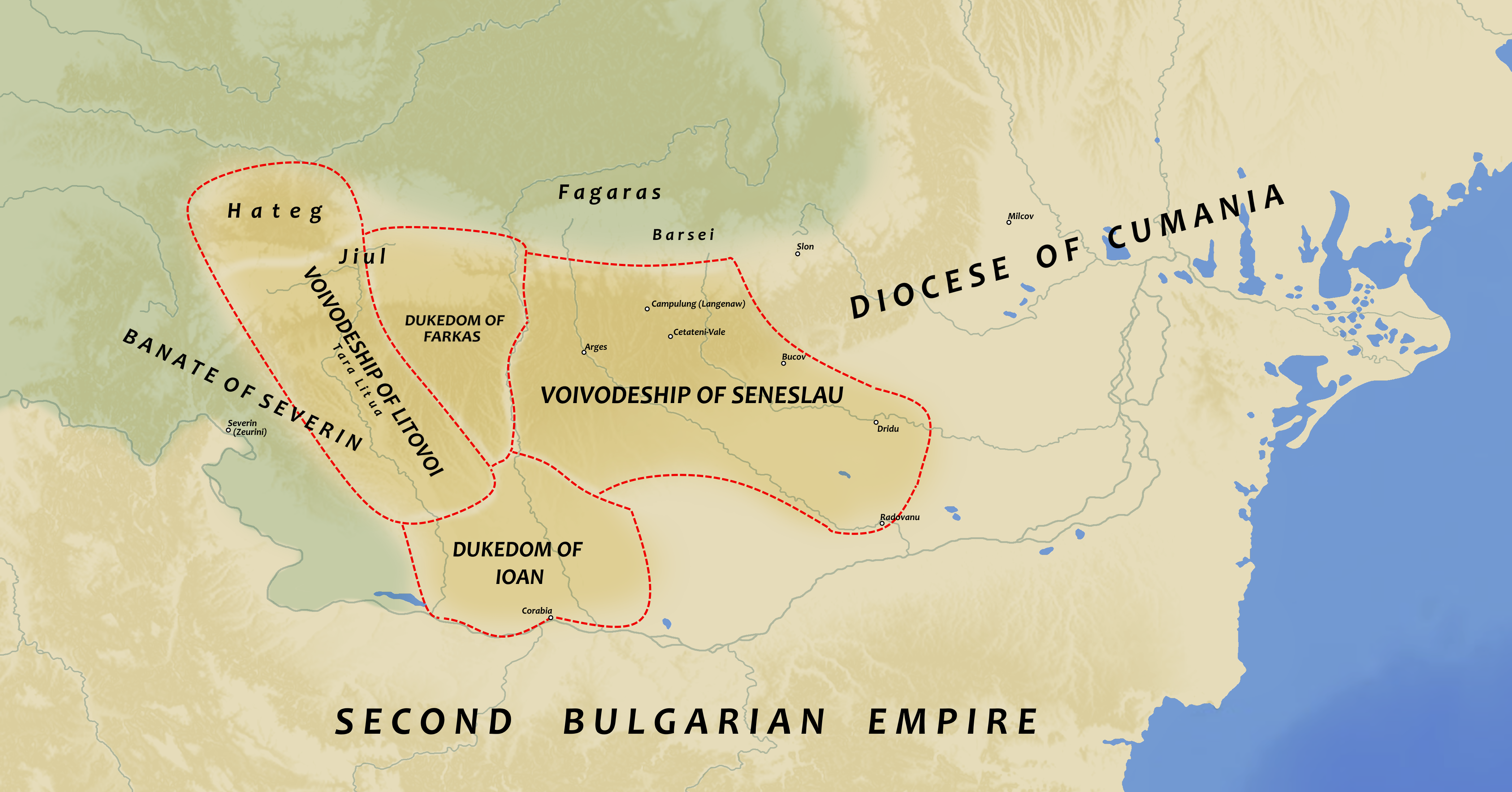
The political situation in Wallachia in the first half of the 13th century according to the Diploma of the Joannites, circa 1247

== War with the Hungarians ==
In 1277 (or between 1277 and 1280), Litovoi was at war with the Hungarians over lands king Ladislaus IV of Hungary (1272–1290) claimed for the crown, but for which Litovoi refused to pay tribute. Litovoi was killed in battle. This event is recounted in the king’s letter of grant of 8 January 1285, in which king Ladislaus IV donated villages in Sáros County (today in Slovakia) to Master George, son of Simon, who had been sent against Litovoi.

Ioan Aurel Pop argues that the Litovoi mentioned in the diploma of 1247 was not identical to the Litovoi whose death is described in the letter of grant of 1285, and the latter was probably the former’s successor.

== See also ==
- Foundation of Wallachia
- Bărbat
- Farcaș
- John (knez)
- Seneslau
- Țara Litua

== Sources ==
- Georgescu, Vlad (Author) – Calinescu, Matei (Editor) – Bley-Vroman, Alexandra (Translator): The Romanians – A History; Ohio State University Press, 1991, Columbus; ISBN 0-8142-0511-9
- Makkai, László: From the Hungarian conquest to the Mongol invasion; in: Köpeczi, Béla (General Editor) – Makkai, László; Mócsy, András; Szász, Zoltán (Editors) – Barta, Gábor (Assistant Editor): History of Transylvania - Volume I: From the beginnings to 1606; Akadémiai Kiadó, 1994, Budapest; ISBN 963-05-6703-2
- Pop, Ioan Aurel: Romanians and Romania: A Brief History; Columbia University Press, 1999, New York; ISBN 0-88033-440-1
- Vásáry, István: Cumans and Tatars: Oriental Military in the Pre-Ottoman Balkans, 1185-1365; Cambridge University Press, 2005, Cambridge; ISBN 0-521-83756-1

Preceded by (?) Bezerenbam	Voivode in Wallachia (before 1247 – 1277/1280)	Succeeded by Bărbat
