= John (knez) =

Cneaz mentioned in the Diploma of the Joannites

John, also Joan or Ioan, was a cneaz (local chieftain or ruler) mentioned in the Diploma of the Joannites issued by King Béla IV of Hungary (1235–1270) on 2 July 1247; the diploma granted territories to the Knights Hospitaller in the Banate of Severin and Cumania. John held a kenazate which was given to the knights by the king. His kenazate lay in southern Oltenia.

The diploma of Béla IV also refers to the kenazates of Farcaş and voivode Litovoi and to voivode Seneslau. Seneslau and Litovoi are expressly said to be Vlachs (Olati) in the king's diploma.

The Romanian historian Ioan-Aurel Pop suggests that the kenazate of John was one of the incipient Romanian states south of the Carpathian Mountains. In the diploma, his name is given in its Latin form (Johannes), and so contains no hint of the nationality of its bearer.

== See also ==
- Founding of Wallachia
- List of princes of Wallachia

== Sources ==
- Pop, Ioan Aurel: Romanians and Romania: A Brief History; Columbia University Press, 1999, New York; ISBN 0-88033-440-1
- Rady, Martyn: Nobility, Land and Service in Medieval Hungary; Palgrave (in association with School of Slavonic and East European Studies, University College London), 2000, New York; ISBN 0-333-80085-0
- Spinei, Victor: The Romanians and the Turkic Nomads North of the Danube Delta from the Tenth to the Mid-Thirteenth Century; Brill, 2009, Leiden and Boston; ISBN 978-90-04-17536-5
- Treptow, Kurt W. - Popa, Marcel: Historical Dictionary of Romania (part ‘Historical Chronology’); Scarecrow Press, Inc., 1996, Lanham and Folkestone; ISBN 0-8108-3179-1
- Vásáry, István: Cumans and Tatars: Oriental Military in the Pre-Ottoman Balkans, 1185-1365; Cambridge University Press, 2005, Cambridge; ISBN 0-521-83756-1
