= Knez (Vlach leader) =

Hungarian and Balkan Vlach community leader

Knez or Kenez (Romanian: cnez/cneaz or chinez; Hungarian: kenéz; Latin: kenezius, Serbian Cyrillic: кнез) was one of the titles given to the leader of the Vlach communities in Wallachia and western Balkans during the Middle Ages.

== Terminology ==
In the medieval Kingdom of Hungary, official documents, written in Latin, applied multiple terms when they mentioned the Vlach leaders (or chiefs) in the Kingdom of Hungary in the 13th and 14th centuries. The most widely used terms – kenezius and its variants – derived from the Slavic knyaz ("ruler"). The office was closely associated with communities living according to the "Vlach law", thus the term knez was replaced by the term scultetus in the northeastern regions, where German law prevailed. A territory subjected to the authority of a knez was known as keneziatus (or keneziate). Several keneziates formed a voivodate, which was subjected to a higher official, the voivode.

In the western parts of the medieval Balkans, knez was one of the terms used to refer to the leader of a Vlach katun, alongside katunar and other titles. In the 14th century and especially after the beginning of the 15th century, the term knez became more and more frequent in historical sources of the western Balkans, where it also referred to the leader of several katuns. The knez was then responsible for the social order of his community and acted as an intermediary between his people and the higher states of the feudal state of which his katun was part.

== History and status ==
The nature and status of the knezes differed from region to region, according to both the district and the condition upon which they acquired the title. In Apuseni Mountains and neighbouring areas there were at least three types: where the institution of voivode was retained, knezes had a supporting role, dealing with legal cases and social order, similar to a jury, under the leadership of the voivode. In areas outside districtus Valachorum, for example around Gyulafehérvár, they became "common knezes", their "jury duty" was limited to their village and they were subordinated to local nobles. Where neither a voivode or a noble had direct control, the knezes were able to gain more power and influence, becoming members of regional petty nobility.

As early as the 14th century, knezes had to pay an annual fee for the acknowledgement of their status by the Hungarian noble such as the kneze of Nucșoara who, from 1394, was due an ox to the voivode of Transylvania.

During the reign of Louis I of Hungary the noble status of knezes had to be confirmed by the King, and in consequence, their titles of property and nobility became dependant on the decisions of the royal court.

The earliest mention of the title in the documents of the Kingdom of Hungary, along with the title of voivode, comes from 1247 when Béla IV of Hungary gives the "Land of Severin" to the Knights Hospitallers with two polities (kenezatus of John and Farcaș), except kenezatus of voivode Litovoi which was left to the Vlachs as they held it.

== See also ==
- Knyaz
- Katun (community)

== Sources ==
- Makkai, László (1994). "The Emergence of the Estates (1172–1526)". In Köpeczi, Béla; Barta, Gábor; Bóna, István; Makkai, László; Szász, Zoltán; Borus, Judit (eds.). History of Transylvania. Akadémiai Kiadó. pp. 178–243. ISBN 963-05-6703-2.
- Pop, Ioan-Aurel (2013). "De manibus Valachorum scismaticorum...": Romanians and Power in the Mediaeval Kingdom of Hungary: The Thirteenth and Fourteenth Centuries. Peter Lang Edition. ISBN 978-3-631-64866-7.
- Rábik, Vladimír (2007). "The Ruthenian and Wallachian population of Eastern Slovakia in the Middle Ages" (PDF). Historický Časopis. 55 (Supplement): 35–62. ISSN 0018-2575.
- Vucinich, Wayne S. (1975). A study in social survival: the katun in Bileća Rudine. Denver: University of Denver.
