= Bărbat =

Ruler of northern Oltenia during the 13th century

Bărbat (Romanian: Man) was the brother and successor of voivode Litovoi whose territory had comprised northern Oltenia (Romania).

== War with Hungary ==
In 1277 (or between 1277 and 1280), Litovoi renounced fealty to king Ladislaus IV of Hungary (1272–1290) when the king claimed lands for the crown, but Litovoi refused to pay tribute for them. King Ladislaus IV dispatched a punitive force, and Litovoi was killed during the battle against the Hungarian army. Bărbat was taken prisoner and sent to the royal court where he was forced not only to pay ransom but also to recognize Hungarian rule. After Bărbat accepted Hungarian suzerainty under the duress of circumstances, he returned to his country.

All these events are recounted in the king’s letter of grant of 8 January 1285, in which king Ladislaus IV donated villages in Sáros County (today in Slovakia) to Master George, son of Simon, who had been sent against Litovoi.

== See also ==
- Foundation of Wallachia
- Litovoi
- Țara Litua

== Sources ==
- Georgescu, Vlad (Author) – Calinescu, Matei (Editor) – Bley-Vroman, Alexandra (Translator): The Romanians – A History; Ohio State University Press, 1991, Columbus; ISBN 0-8142-0511-9
- Makkai, László: From the Hungarian conquest to the Mongol invasion; in: Köpeczi, Béla (General Editor) – Makkai, László; Mócsy, András; Szász, Zoltán (Editors) – Barta, Gábor (Assistant Editor): History of Transylvania - Volume I: From the beginnings to 1606; Akadémiai Kiadó, 1994, Budapest; ISBN 963-05-6703-2
- Pop, Ioan Aurel: Romanians and Romania: A Brief History; Columbia University Press, 1999, New York; ISBN 0-88033-440-1
- Vásáry, István: Cumans and Tatars: Oriental Military in the Pre-Ottoman Balkans, 1185-1365; Cambridge University Press, 2005, Cambridge; ISBN 0-521-83756-1

Preceded by Litovoi	Voivode in Wallachia (1277/1280 – unknown)	Succeeded by (?) Tihomir
