= Thocomerius =

Father of Basarab I of Wallachia and his possible predecessor

Thocomerius, also Tihomir, was the father of Basarab, who would become the first independent voivode of Wallachia. Many Romanian historians, such as Vlad Georgescu and Marcel Popa, believe that Thocomerius was a voivode in Wallachia who succeeded Bărbat, who ruled around 1278; others, such as Tudor Sălăgean, refer to him as a local potentate whose status cannot be specified.

== Name ==
Thocomerius' name is only known from a diploma issued by King Charles I of Hungary on 26 November 1332. The diploma refers to "the schismatic Basarab, son of Thocomerius, our disloyal Vlach." ("Basarab, filium Thocomerii, scismaticum, infidelis Olahus Nostris").

The Hungarian László Rásonyi derives the name from a Cuman and Tatar name, Toq-tämir ("hardened iron"), and refers to a Chingisid prince, Toktomer, mentioned in the Russian annals in 1295 as abiding in the Crimea. According to István Vásáry, even if Basarab’s father bore a Turkic name, this person can by no means be identified with a Chingisid prince, because being descended from Genghis Khan was a matter of such significance that no one could, or would have wanted, to conceal it.

== See also ==
- Țara Litua

== Sources ==
- Djuvara, Neagu: Thocomerius – Negru Vodă. Un voivod de origine cumană la începuturile Țării Românești / Thocomerius – Negru Vodă: A Voivode of Cuman Origin at the Beginnings of Wallachia, Humanitas, 2007
- Georgescu, Vlad (Author) – Călinescu, Matei (Editor) – Bley-Vroman, Alexandra (Translator): The Romanians – A History; Ohio State University Press, 1991, Columbus; ISBN 0-8142-0511-9
- Sălăgean, Tudor: Romanian Society in the Early Middle Ages (9th-10th Centuries); in: Ioan-Aurel Pop – Ioan Bolovan (Editors): History of Romania: Compendium; Romanian Cultural Institute (Center for Transylvanian Studies), 2006, Cluj-Napoca; ISBN 978-973-7784-12-4
- Treptow, Kurt W. – Popa, Marcel: Historical Dictionary of Romania (table ‘Rulers of Romania - Wallachia’); The Scarecrow Press, Inc., 1996, Lanham (Maryland, USA) & Folkestone (UK); ISBN 0-8108-3179-1
- Vásáry, István: Cumans and Tatars: Oriental Military in the Pre-Ottoman Balkans, 1185-1365; Cambridge University Press, 2005, Cambridge; ISBN 0-521-83756-1

Preceded by Bărbat	(?) Voivode in Wallachia (unknown – c. 1310)	Succeeded by Basarab I
