= Seneslau =

Vlach voievode mentioned in the Diploma of the Joannites

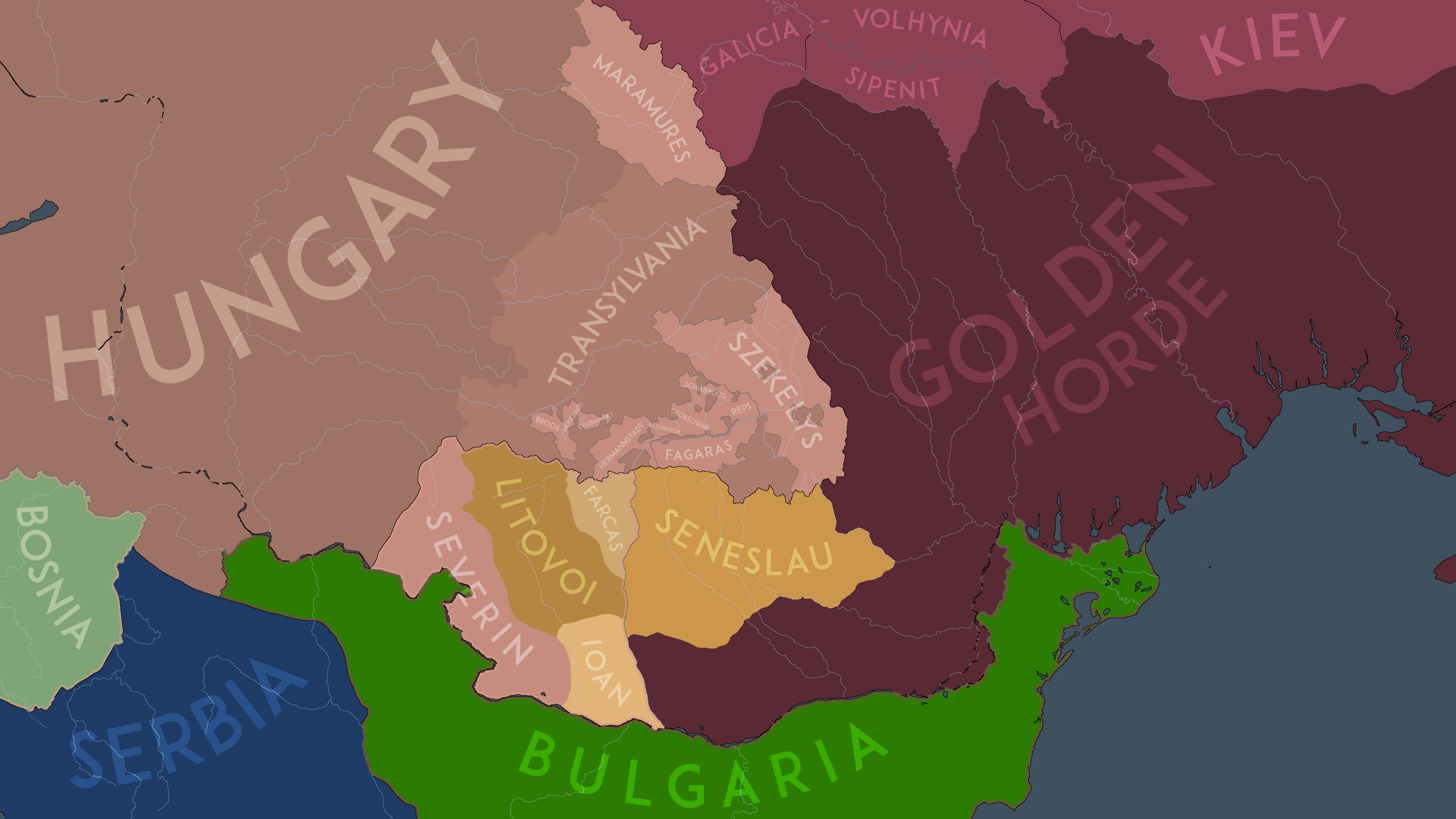
Romanian state formations in 1246

Seneslau, also Seneslav or Stănislau, was a Vlach voivode mentioned in the Diploma of the Joannites issued by king Béla IV of Hungary (1235–1270) on 2 July 1247. The diploma granted territories to the Knights Hospitaller in the Banate of Severin and Cumania. According to the diploma, the king gave the territories east of the Olt River to the knights, with the exception of the territory of voivode Seneslau.

The name of Seneslav is of Slavic origin. Seneslau held central and southern Muntenia (i.e., the territories along the rivers Argeş and Dâmboviţa). The Romanian historian Ioan Aurel Pop suggests that Seneslau was quasi independent of the king of Hungary. According to the Hungarian historian István Vásáry, his title (voivode) suggests that he had a territorial unit under his jurisdiction.

The diploma of Béla IV also refers to the kenazates of John, Farcaş and voivode Litovoi. Although the names of Seneslau and Litovoi are of Slavic origin, they are expressly said to be Vlachs (Olati) in the king's diploma.

== See also ==
- Founding of Wallachia
- List of princes of Wallachia

== Sources ==
- Georgescu, Vlad (Author) – Calinescu, Matei (Editor) – Bley-Vroman, Alexandra (Translator): The Romanians – A History; Ohio State University Press, 1991, Columbus; ISBN 0-8142-0511-9
- Pop, Ioan Aurel: Romanians and Romania: A Brief History; Columbia University Press, 1999, New York; ISBN 0-88033-440-1
- Treptow, Kurt W. - Popa, Marcel: Historical Dictionary of Romania (part Historical Chronology); Scarecrow Press, Inc., 1996, Lanham & Folkestone; ISBN 0-8108-3179-1
- Vásáry, István: Cumans and Tatars: Oriental Military in the Pre-Ottoman Balkans, 1185-1365; Cambridge University Press, 2005, Cambridge; ISBN 0-521-83756-1
- Златарски, Васил. История на българската държава през средните векове. Том III. Второ българско царство. България при Асеневци (1187—1280), София 1940
- Коледаров, Петър. Политическа география на средновековната българска държава, Втора част (1186–1396), София 1989
