= Banate of Severin =

Unit of the Kingdom of Hungary (1228–1526)

Banate of Severin Szörényi bánság (Hungarian) Banatul Severinului (Romanian) Северинска бановина (Serbian)
- Banate of Kingdom of Hungary
- 1228–1526
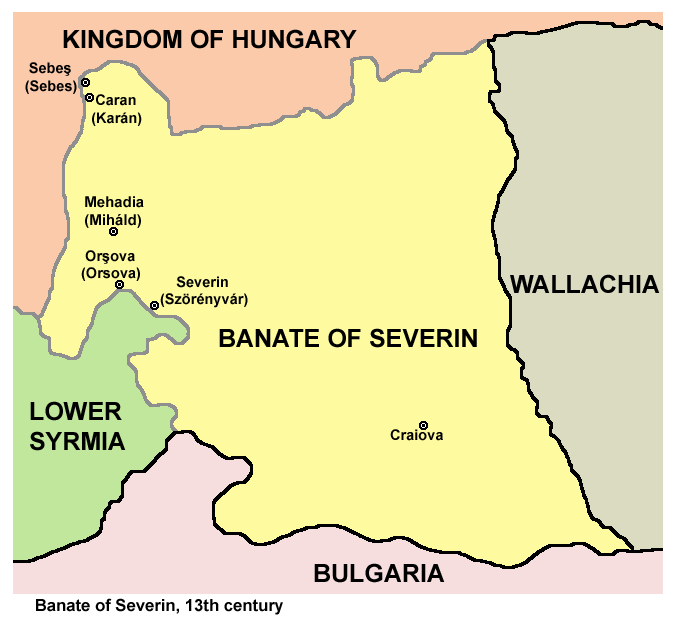
- Map of the banate in the 13th century
- History
  - Established: 1228
  - Disestablished: 1526
Succeeded by
Great Banship of Craiova; Banate of Lugos and Karánsebes
- Today part of: Romania

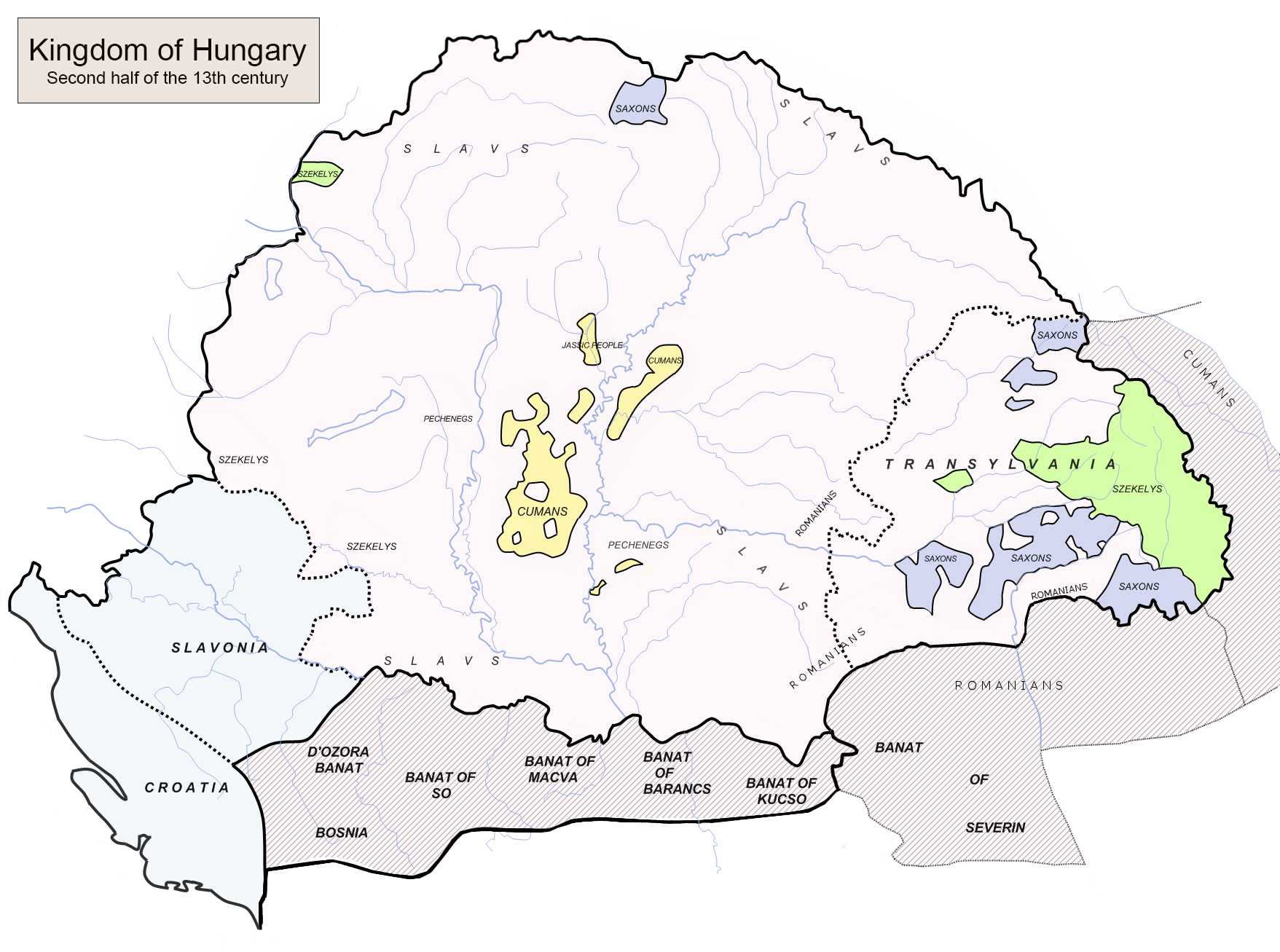
Map of the banates of Hungary and Severin in the 13th century

The Banate of Severin or Banate of Szörény (Hungarian: Szörényi bánság; Romanian: Banatul Severinului; Latin: Banatus Zewrinensis; Bulgarian: Северинско банство, Severinsko banstvo; Serbian: Северинска бановина, Severinska banovina) was a Hungarian political, military and administrative unit with a special role in the initially anti-Bulgarian, latterly anti-Ottoman defensive system of the medieval Kingdom of Hungary. It was founded by Prince Béla in 1228.

== Territory ==
The Banate of Severin was a march (or a border province) of the medieval Kingdom of Hungary between the Lower Danube and the Olt River (in present-day Oltenia in Romania). A charter of grant, issued on 2 June 1247 to the Knights Hospitallers, mentioned the Olt as its eastern border. The Knights received the "Land of Severin" (Terra de Zeurino), along with the nearby mountains, from Béla IV of Hungary. The king had described the same region as a "deserted and depopulated" land in a letter to Pope Gregory IX on 7 June 1238. Modern scholars assume that either the Hungarian conquest of the territory or confrontations between Bulgaria and Hungary had forced the local population to flee. Historian László Makkai says, the population began to increase by the end of the 1230s, because Béla requested the pope to appoint a bishop for Severin.

The 1247 charter of grant also mentioned that "Cumania" bordered the Land of Severin from the east. The same diploma listed two Vlach (or Romanian) political units—the kenezatus of John and Farcaș—which were subjected to the Hospitallers on this occasion. A third kenezatus, which was ruled by Voivode Litovoi, was not included in the grant, but it was left to the Vlachs "as they had held it". However, Béla gave the Hospitallers half of the royal revenues collected in Litovoi's land, with the exception of the revenues from the "Land of Hátszeg" (now Țara Hațegului in Romania). Alexandru Madgearu says, the diploma shows that Litovoi's kenezatus bordered the Land of Severin to the north, thus the banate must have only included southern Oltenia in the middle of the 13th century. The kenezatus of Voivode Seneslau, which was located to the east of the Olt, was fully excluded from the grant.

The bans initially had their seat at the fortress of Szörény (now Drobeta-Turnu Severin in Romania). After Szörény was lost in the late 13th century, the fort of Miháld (now Mehadia in Romania) was the center of the province. In addition to Miháld, the banate included Orsova (now Orșova in Romania) and the Romanian districts along the upper course of the Temes (Timiș) river.

== History ==
Kaloyan of Bulgaria occupied the region between the rivers Cerna and the Olt around 1199. The Kingdom of Hungary was also expanding southwards over the Carpathian Mountains in the early 13th century, which gave rise to conflicts between the two countries. The Cuman tribes dwelling to the east of the Olt as far as the river Siret agreed to pay a yearly tribute to the kings of Hungary in early 1227. The Hungarians captured the Bulgarian fortress of Severin during a military campaign against Bulgaria in 1231.

In 1330 the Banate was roughly conquered by Basarab I, and most of it remained in the jurisdiction of Wallachia for the next centuries.

After the 1526 Battle of Mohács, the Banate of Severin was divided. The south-eastern part (eastwards from Varcsaró - Vârciorova, today part of Bolvașnița) came under the jurisdiction of Wallachian princes and in the north-western part (westwards from Orsova - present-day Orșova - inclusive) was gradually reorganized into the Banate of Lugos and Karánsebes.

== Bans of Severin ==
=== Thirteenth century ===
Term	Incumbent	Monarch	Notes	Source
c. 1226–c. 1232	Buzád Hahót	Andrew II	He styled himself "former ban" in 1233. His close relationship with Andrew II's son, Béla, Duke of Transylvania, suggests that he was the ban of Severin (instead of being the ban of Slavonia).	
c. 1233	Lucas	Andrew II		
1235	Pous Csák	Béla IV	Also Master of the treasury and ispán (or head) of Bács County	
c. 1240	Osl Osl	Béla IV		
c. 1243	Stephen Csák	Béla IV		
c. 1260	Lawrence, son of Kemény	Béla IV	First rule.	
c. 1262	Stephen	Béla IV	He is only mentioned in a non-authentic charter.	
c. 1263	Lawrence	Stephen V (king junior)	Also Master of the treasury of Stephen V.	
c. 1268	Alexander, son of Drugh	Stephen V (king junior)		
c. 1268	Ugrin Csák	Stephen V (king junior)	First rule.	
c. 1270	Lawrence, son of Kemény	Stephen V	Second rule. Also ispán of Doboka County.	
c. 1270	Panyit Miskolc	Stephen V		
1271–1272	Lawrence, son of Kemény	Stephen V	Third rule. Also ispán of Doboka County.	
1272	Albert Ákos	Stephen V		
1272–1274	Paul Gutkeled	Ladislaus IV	First rule. Also ispán of Valkó and Doboka Counties.	
1274–1275	Ugrin Csák	Ladislaus IV	Second rule.	
1275	Paul Gutkeled	Ladislaus IV	Second rule.	
1275–1276	Mikod Kökényesradnót	Ladislaus IV		
1276	Ugrin Csák	Ladislaus IV	Third rule.	
1277–1278	Paul Gutkeled (?)	Ladislaus IV	He is only mentioned in non-authentic charters. Third rule.	
1279	Lawrence, son of Lawrence	Ladislaus IV	First rule.	
1291	Lawrence, son of Lawrence	Andrew III	Second rule, but he may have continuously held the office from 1279 to 1291	

=== Fourteenth century ===
Term	Incumbent	Monarch	Notes	Source
1335–1341	Denis Szécsi	Charles I	Also master of the stewards.	
1342–1349	Stephen Losonci	Charles I, Louis I		
1350–1355	Nicholas Szécsi	Louis I	Also ispán of Keve and Krassó Counties.	
1355–1359	Denis Lackfi	Louis I	Also master of the horse, and ispán of Keve and Krassó Counties.	
1359–1375	Vacant.			
1375–1376	John Treutel	Louis I		
1376–1387	Vacant.			

1. 1299–1307 András Tárnok
2. 1308–1313 András Tárnok and Márton Tárnok
3. 1314–1318 Domokos Csornai
4. 1319–1323 László Rátholti
5. 1323–1329 Dénes Szécsi
6. 1324 Pál
7. 1330–1341 Dénes Szécsi
8. 1342–1349 István Losonci
9. 1350–1355 Miklós Szécsi
10. 1355–1359 Dénes Lackfi
11. 1359–1375 vacant
12. 1376 János Treutel
13. 1376–1387 vacant
14. 1387 László Losonci Jr.
15. 1387–1388 István Losonci
16. 1388–1390 János Kaplai-Serkei
17. 1390–1391 Miklós Perényi
18. 1392 Szemere Gerebenci
19. 1392–1393 Bebek Detre
20. 1393 Frank Szécsi
21. 1393–1397 vacant
22. 1397 Lukács of Oszkola
23. 1393–1408 vacant
24. 1408–1409 Pipo of Ozora
25. 1409 vacant
26. 1410 Lőrinc, son of Majos
27. 1410–1428 vacant
28. 1428 Imre Marcali
29. 1430–1435 Miklós Redwitz
30. 1429–1435 vacant
31. 1435 László Hagymás of Beregszó and János Dancs of Macedonia
32. 1436–1439 Franko Talovac
33. 1439–1446 John Hunyadi, Ban of Severin
34. 1445–1446 Miklós Újlaki
35. 1447–1454 Mihály Csornai
36. 1449 Balázs Csornai
37. 1452–1454 Péter Dancs of Sebes
38. 1455-57 vacant
39. 1458 Vlad and Gergely Bethlen
40. 1459–1460 vacant
41. 1460 László Dóczi
42. 1462–1463 Nicholas of Ilok
43. 1464–1466 vacant
44. 1466 János Pongrácz of Dengeleg
45. 1467 vacant
46. 1467 István and Mihály de Muthnoki
47. 1468–1471 vacant
48. 1471–1478 Imre Hédervári
49. 1478 János Erdő and Domokos Bethlen
50. 1478 vacant
51. 1479 Ambrus Török and György Szenthelsebethi
52. 1479 Bertalan Pathócsy
53. 1480–1483 Bertalan Pathócsy and Ferenc Haraszti
54. 1483–1489 Ferenc Haraszti and András Szokoly
55. 1490 Imre Ozorai
56. 1491 Imre Ozorai and Dánfy András of Doboz
57. 1491–1492 Ferenc Haraszti and Dánfy András of Doboz
58. 1492 Móré Fülöp Csulai
59. 1492–1494 Móré György Csulai and Ferenc Balassa
60. 1495–1501 Tárnok Péter Macskási and Jakab Gerlisthey
61. 1501 Jakab Gerlisthey and Bélai Barnabás
62. 1502 Jakab Gerlisthey and Tárnok Péter Macskási
63. 1503 Bélai Barnabás
64. 1503 Jakab Gerlisthey
65. 1504–1508 Jakab Gerlisthey and Barnabás Bélai
66. 1508–1513 Mihály Paksi and Barnabás Bélai
67. 1514 Barnabás Bélai and János Szapolyai
68. 1515–1516 Miklós Hagymási of Berekszó
69. 1517–1518 vacant
70. 1519 Bélai Barnabás
71. 1520–1521 Miklós Gerlisthey
72. 1522–1523 János Vitéz Kállay
73. 1524–1526 János Vitéz Kállay and János Szapolyai
74. 1526–1540 Under the rule of Lugos and Karánsebes Bans
75. 1526–1860 Under Ottoman occupation

== See also ==
- Banat of Craiova
- Țara Amlașului
- Țara Făgărașului
- Glad
- Ahtum

== Bibliography ==
- Curta, Florin (2006). Southeastern Europe in the Middle Ages, 500-1250. Cambridge University Press. ISBN 978-0-521-89452-4.
- Engel, Pál (1996). Magyarország világi archontológiája, 1301–1457, I. [Secular Archontology of Hungary, 1301–1457, Volume I] (in Hungarian). História, MTA Történettudományi Intézete. ISBN 963-8312-44-0.
- Engel, Pál (2001). The Realm of St Stephen: A History of Medieval Hungary, 895–1526. I.B. Tauris Publishers. ISBN 1-86064-061-3.
- Madgearu, Alexandru (2017). The Asanids: The Political and Military History of the Second Bulgarian Empire, 1185–1280. BRILL. ISBN 978-9-004-32501-2.
- Makkai, László (1994a). "szörényi bánság [Banate of Severin]". In Kristó, Gyula; Engel, Pál; Makk, Ferenc (eds.). Korai magyar történeti lexikon (9–14. század) [Encyclopedia of the Early Hungarian History (9th–14th centuries)] (in Hungarian). Akadémiai Kiadó. p. 657. ISBN 963-05-6722-9.
- Makkai, László (1994b). "The Emergence of the Estates (1172–1526)". In Köpeczi, Béla; Barta, Gábor; Bóna, István; Makkai, László; Szász, Zoltán; Borus, Judit (eds.). History of Transylvania. Akadémiai Kiadó. pp. 178–243. ISBN 963-05-6703-2.
- Papacostea, Șerban (1998). Between the Crusade and the Mongol Empire. Center for Transylvanian Studies, Romanian Cultural Foundation. ISBN 973-577-186-1.
- Pop, Ioan-Aurel (2013). "De manibus Valachorum scismaticorum...": Romanians and Power in the Mediaeval Kingdom of Hungary, The Thirteenth and Fourteenth Centuries. Peter Land Edition. ISBN 978-3-631-64866-7.
- Vásáry, István (2005). Cumans and Tatars: Oriental Military in the Pre-Ottoman Balkans, 1185–1365. Cambridge University Press. ISBN 0-521-83756-1.
- Zsoldos, Attila (2011). Magyarország világi archontológiája, 1000–1301 [Secular Archontology of Hungary, 1000–1301] (in Hungarian). História, MTA Történettudományi Intézete. ISBN 978-963-9627-38-3.
