= Severin Fortress =

Heritage site in Mehedinți County, Romania

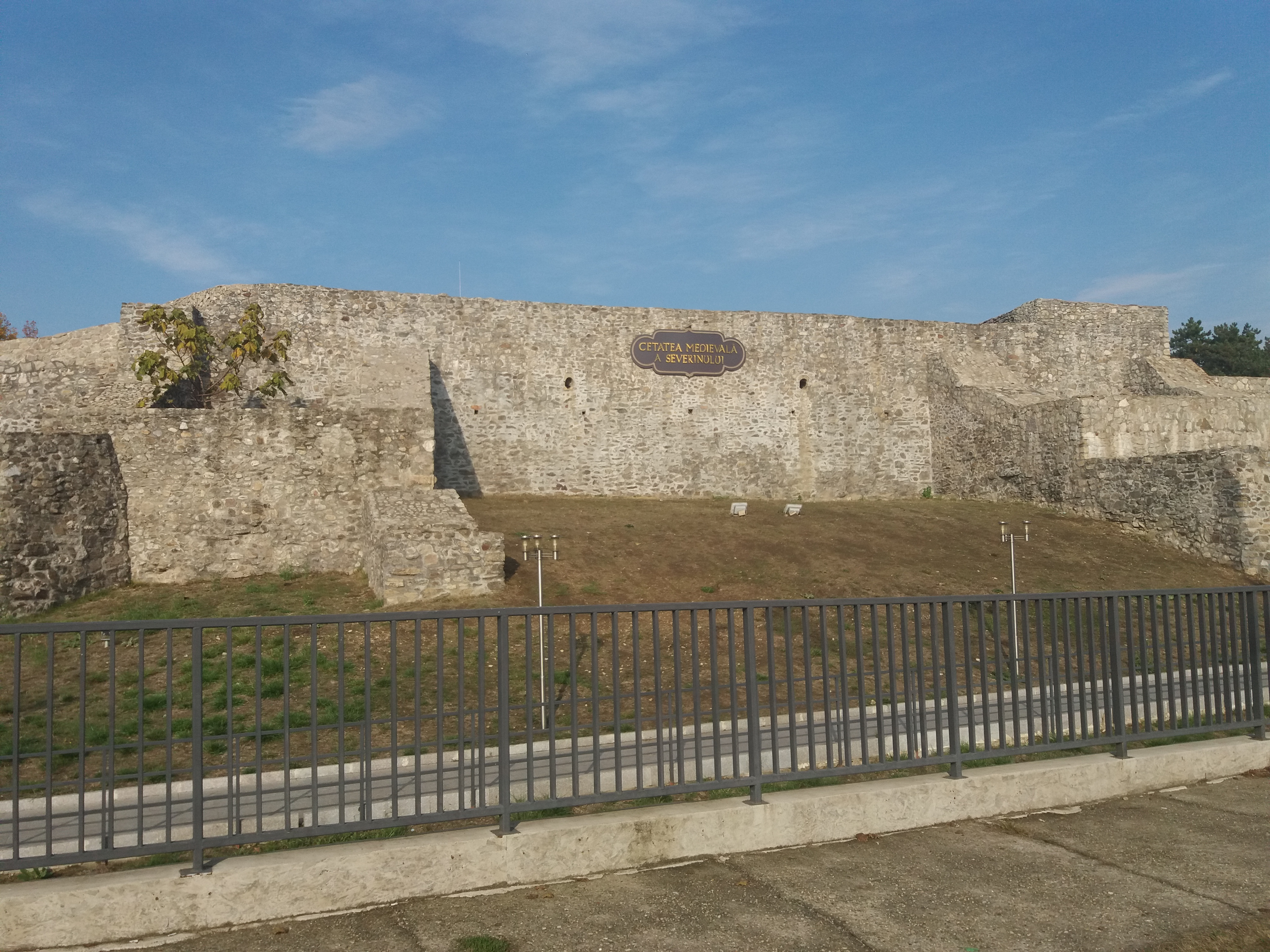
Severin Medieval Fortress

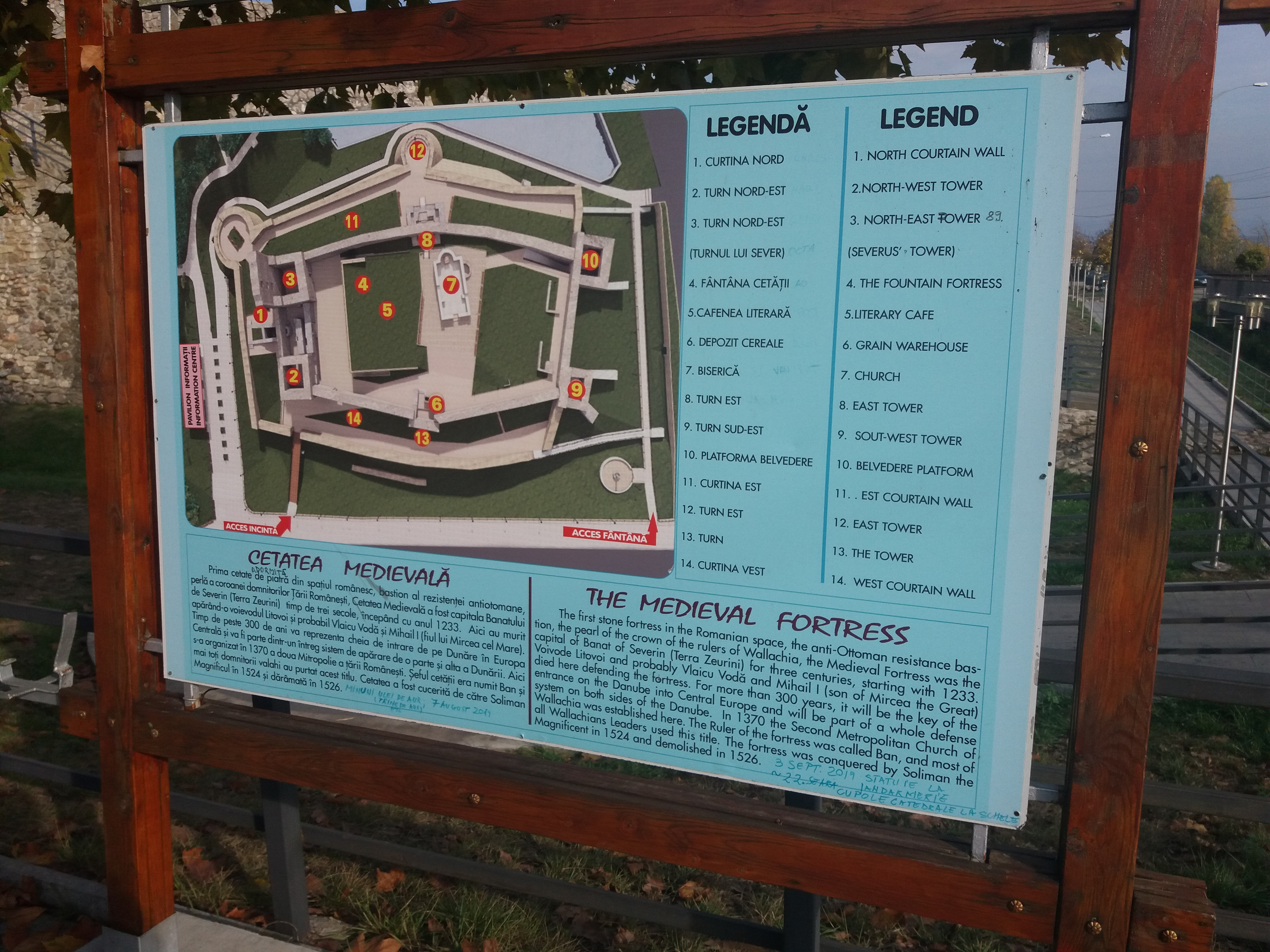
Severin Medieval Fortress Entrance information

Severin Fortress is a set of historical monuments located on the territory of Drobeta Turnu Severin, Romania. In the National Archaeological Repertory, the monument appears with the code 109782.07.01.
