= Diploma of the Joannites =

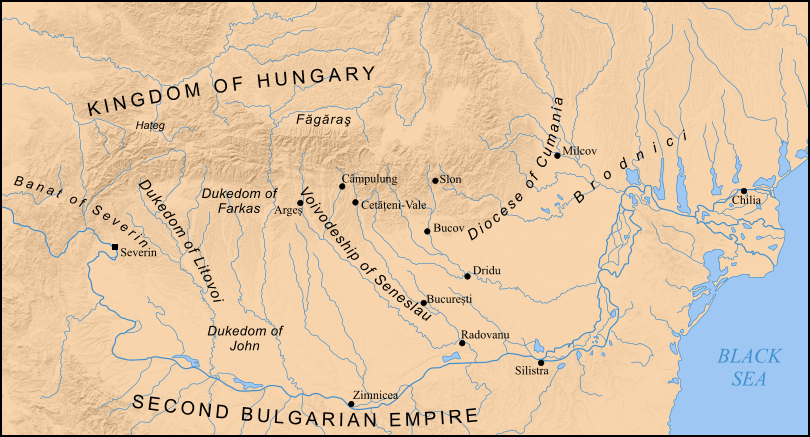
Probable location of polities described in the Diploma of the Joannites

The Diploma of the Joannites is a royal charter issued in 1247 by Béla IV of Hungary to the Knights Hospitaller. It is one of the most important written sources for early medieval history north of the Lower Danube. After the Mongol invasion of Hungary of 1241-1242, Hungary was devastated. Béla IV began reorganising and fortifying the kingdom's southern and eastern frontiers, granting lands in the Severin region to the Hospitallers in exchange for border protection against Cumans and other steppe groups. The diploma provides valuable information regarding the existence of early Romanians polities in modern-day Oltenia. The document references local Romanian rulers such as: Litovoi, Seneslau, Farcaș and John, giving insight about early Wallachian political structures, as well as broader detail about the economic development and administration of the region following the Mongol invasion.

== See also ==
- Litovoi
- Seneslau
- John
- Farcaș
