= Neagu Djuvara =

Romanian historian (1916–2018)

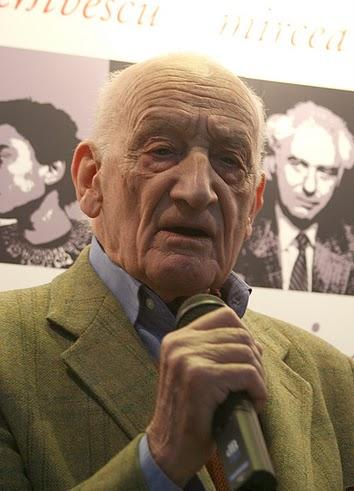
- Djuvara in 2008
- Born: Marcel Djuvara-Neagu-Bunea; August 18, 1916; Bucharest, Kingdom of Romania
- Died: January 25, 2018 (aged 101); Bucharest, Romania
- Resting place: Bellu Cemetery, Bucharest
- Education: University of Paris
- Occupations: Writer; historian; philosopher; journalist; diplomat
- Writing career
- Language: Romanian
- Notable awards: Prix Broquette-Gonin; Order of the Star of Romania

Neagu Bunea Djuvara (Romanian pronunciation: [ˈne̯aɡu dʒjuˈvara]; 18 August 1916 – 25 January 2018) was a Romanian historian, essayist, philosopher, journalist, novelist, and diplomat.

== Biography ==
=== Early life ===
A native of Bucharest, he was descended from an aristocratic Aromanian family. His father, Marcel, a graduate of the Technische Hochschule in Charlottenburg (now Technische Universität Berlin) and a captain in the Romanian Royal Army's Engineer Corps, died of the Spanish flu in 1918; his mother, Tinca, was the last descendant of the Grădișteanu family of boyar origins (according to Djuvara, she was related to all boyar families in Wallachia). Djuvara's uncles Trandafir and Alexandru Djuvara were notable public figures. Djuvara was born during World War I; as an infant, he was taken by his family into refuge in Iași after the occupation of southern Romania by the Central Powers, and then, through Imperial Russia, into Belgium, where Trandafir Djuvara was Minister Plenipotentiary.

He attended lycée in Nice, France, and graduated in Letters (1937) and Law (1940) from the University of Paris (his Law thesis dealt with the antisemitic legislation passed by the governments of King Carol II in Romania). Djuvara later stated that, at the time, his political sympathies veered towards the far right: he became a supporter of the Romanian fascist movement, the Iron Guard, and took part in the February 1934 riot against the French Radical-Socialist government of Édouard Daladier.

During World War II, he returned to Romania, where he married and fathered a daughter. He joined the Romanian Armed Forces and was stationed in Ploiești under the Iron Guard's National Legionary government.

Following the establishment of Ion Antonescu's dictatorship and the start of Operation Barbarossa (see Romania during World War II), as an officer cadet, he fought on the Eastern Front, saw action in Bassarabia and Transnistria, before being wounded in the arm during the Battle of Odessa (1941). He stated that he gave up his interest in the far right after a 1943 dialog with fellow diplomat Victor Rădulescu-Pogoneanu, who convinced Djuvara to become "a supporter of parliamentary democracy".

=== Diplomat ===
Subsequently, Djuvara decided to apply for office in the diplomatic corps, won the competition, and was sent by Foreign Minister Mihai Antonescu as a diplomatic courier to Sweden, on the very day Ion Antonescu was toppled by a coup d'état and Romania pulled out of the Axis powers to join the Allies (23 August 1944). In this capacity, he was instructed to communicate to the Romanian Ambassador in Stockholm, Frederic Nanu, that he was to ask the Soviet representative Alexandra Kollontai whether earlier terms advanced by Joseph Stalin in regard to peace with Romania were still valid (Nanu was also told not to inform the Western Allies of these talks).

Speaking in retrospect, he argued against claims made by Nanu, according to which Ion Antonescu had thus indicated his willingness to step down and hand leadership of Romania to King Mihai I. According to Djuvara, the last Soviet offer for Antonescu made only minor concessions – the entire country was to be occupied by the Red Army, with the exception of a random western county (to function as a provisional administrative center), and 15 days were given to the Romanian government to reach an armistice with Nazi Germany (Djuvara considered this latter expectation particularly unrealistic, as it involved Germany consciously abandoning Romanian territory to its enemy). Furthermore, Djuvara indicated, "Neither I nor Nanu were mandated to sign any document, to launch into any peace process".

Appointed Legation Secretary in Stockholm by the Constantin Sănătescu executive, Djuvara was dismissed by the new Romanian Communist Party officials upon Ana Pauker's appointment as Foreign Minister (1947).

=== Exile ===
Having been implicated in absentia in the series of show trials inaugurated in the wake of Communist Romania by the Tămădău Affair, accused of being a spy, he decided to remain abroad. He left for Paris and was subsequently involved in advocacy of anti-communist political causes and the rallying of exiled intellectuals. Briefly employed by the International Refugee Organization, Djuvara became involved with the body of Romanian exiles, the Romanian National Committee, and helped organise American-assisted drops of voluntary paratroopers in support of the Romanian anti-communist resistance (most of whom were captured by the Securitate). He renounced his position by 1951, and subsequently worked for the exile magazine Casa Românească.

In 1961, he settled in Niger, serving as an adviser for the country's Foreign Ministry (extending a two-year contract until 1984), and was a professor of International Law and Economic History at the University of Niamey. Djuvara was an acquaintance of President Hamani Diori, and notably accompanied him on official duty to Addis Ababa, attending the opening session of the Organisation of African Unity (1963). Having already begun to further his studies of philosophy in Paris, he received a Sorbonne doctorat d'État in the Philosophy of history (with the thesis Civilisations et lois historiques, guided by Raymond Aron). He was later awarded a diploma in Philology from INALCO.

After 1984, he returned to Europe, resuming his activities with Casa Românească and other Romanian cultural institutions in exile. Djuvara was an active contributor to Radio Free Europe, and divided his time between Paris and Munich (occasionally traveling to Canada and the United States).

=== Post-1989 ===
Djuvara returned to his native country soon after the Romanian Revolution of 1989. Between 1991 and 1998, he was an associate professor at the University of Bucharest. During the early 1990s, he was a noted critic of Romanian political developments, and especially of the Mineriad and the National Salvation Front government.

He later joined the National Liberal Party, and expressed his concern that President Traian Băsescu was unable to complete planned reforms in the wake of Romania's accession to the European Union, as well as his belief that the former Securitate was still in a position of power. He also took a conservative stance on European affairs, being a vocal critic of Europe's multiculturalism. In August 2016, Djuvara turned 100, and upon the occasion was made a knight of the Order of the Star of Romania. His last public appearance was on 5 December 2017, when in an interview, he expressed his grief over the demise of King Michael. He died from pneumonia in Bucharest on 25 January 2018, at the age of 101 years and 147 days, and was buried at Bellu Cemetery.

Djuvara was survived by his daughter, granddaughters, and great-granddaughters. Most of his works in Romanian were published by Humanitas.

== Work as a historian ==
Most of Djuvara's work concerns the history of Romania and that of the Romanian people, although he published significant works pertaining to the philosophy of history, particularly questioning the existence of what he called "truthful history".

Regarding Romanian history, Djuvara advocated continued and extensive research into what he believed was still unexplored territory. His views were often seen as undermining a Romanian national identity, mainly because of his doubts on the scientific accuracy of most historic research done in Romania since the Great Union of 1918, and putting forward controversial hypotheses concerning the origin of the Romanians, such as advancing the theory that the vast majority of the nobility in the medieval states that made up the territory of modern-day Romania was of Cuman origin.

He also published extensively regarding the relationship between his native Romania and Europe, placing the country politically and culturally "between East and West", citing it as the "last to enter what is commonly called the European concert", referring not to Romania's 2007 accession to the European Union, but to the country's change of orientation towards adopting a Western political and cultural model. He had also voiced his concern regarding multiculturalism in Europe, a policy which he viewed as detrimental to stability within the EU.

He was a critic of what he perceived to be an excessively pro-Western attitude in Romanian politics, suggesting that Romanian society and culture could not be classified as Western, citing Orthodoxy as the predominant religion, the presence of many non-Latin elements in the modern Romanian language and the country's history in the past centuries as arguments.

He also wrote about what he called the "American hegemony" and its premises, analysing the influence which the United States and its foreign policy have had on the world and, more specifically, on Europe. He characterised the efforts of the United States to establish what resembles a hegemony in Europe and other parts of the world as a "Seventy-Seven Year War" waged throughout most of the 20th century.

Djuvara can be seen as a populariser and "de-mystifier" of history, having published books aimed a younger audience as well as books seeking to explain the historical basis for mythical figures such as Dracula or Negru Vodă. He also published memories from his exile, recounting his life and work in Paris, France, and Niamey, Niger.

Djuvara claimed that Romanian marshal Ion Antonescu, who ruled Romania during World War II, was in fact an Albanian of Romania or, as he called him, an arnăut. Romanian historian Ion Teodorescu agrees with this view.
