= Ioan-Aurel Pop =

Romanian historian

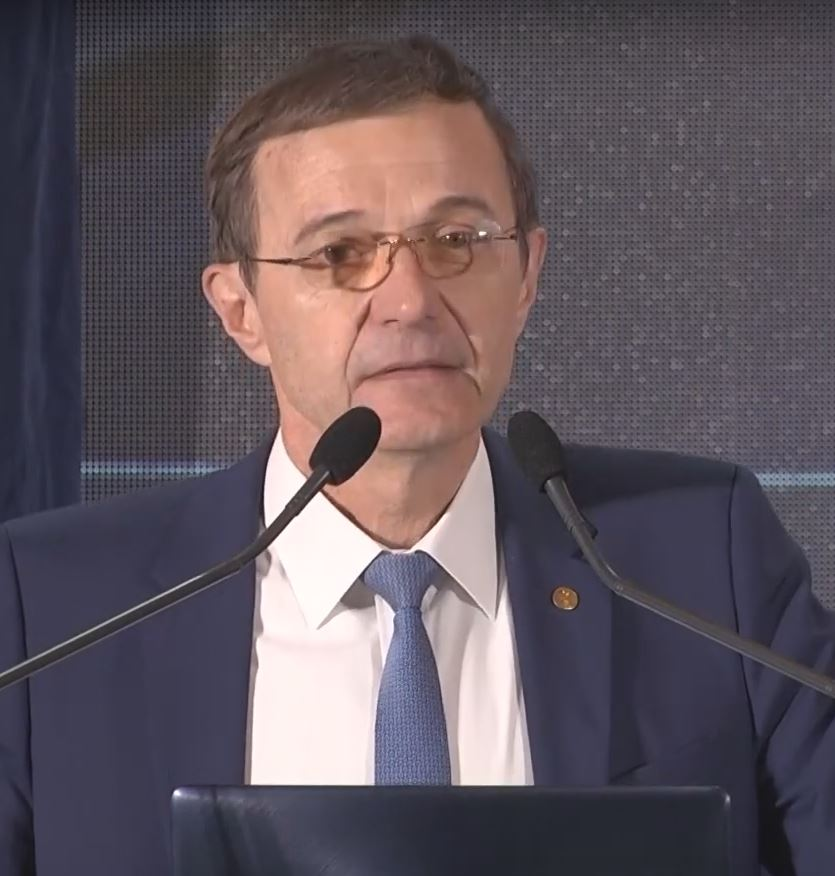
Ioan-Aurel Pop during a conference in 2019

Ioan-Aurel Pop (born 1 January 1955) is a Romanian historian. Pop was appointed professor of history at Babeș-Bolyai University in 1996. He has since been Chairman of the Department of Medieval History and the History of Premodern Art at Babeș-Bolyai University. Since 2012, Pop has been Rector at Babeș-Bolyai University. In 2018 he was elected President of the Romanian Academy and re-elected in 2022.

His work is focused on researching the medieval history of Romanians and of Central and South-East Europe, including Romanian medieval institutions, Romanian-Slavic political formations in Transylvania, the relations of Romanians from Transylvania with the extra-Carpathian Romanian space, the Byzantine influence on Romanians, the relations of Transylvania with Central and Western Europe, and the ethnic and confessional structure of Transylvania. After the appearance of the book History and myth in the Romanian consciousness by Lucian Boia, Pop published a book in reply, partially rejecting the deconstructivist thesis of the Bucharest historian. He also developed alternative school textbooks for high school.

== Biography ==
Pop was born in Sântioana, Cluj County, Popular Republic of Romania. He went to school in Brașov, and then, after completing compulsory military service, he studied Medieval History between 1975 and 1979 at Babeș-Bolyai University in Cluj-Napoca.

He gained his Ph.D. in history in 1989, with a thesis on "The Cenesial Assemblies of Transylvania in the 14th-16th centuries".

In 2010, Pop was awarded by then-President of Romania, Traian Băsescu, the Order of Cultural Merit, Knight rank. In 2015, he was awarded the Order of the Star of Romania, Knight rank. In 2020, he was awarded by Margareta of Romania the Order of the Crown of Romania, Commander rank. In 2021, he was elected member of the Academia Europaea.

== Sources ==
- "Ioan-Aurel Pop" (PDF). Babeș-Bolyai University.
