= Romania in the Early Middle Ages =

The Early Middle Ages in Romania started with the withdrawal of the Roman troops and administration from Dacia province in the 270s. In the next millennium a series of peoples, most of whom only controlled two or three of the nearly ten historical regions that now form Romania, arrived. During this period, society and culture underwent fundamental changes. Town life came to an end in Dacia with the Roman withdrawal, and in Scythia Minor – the other Roman province in the territory of present-day Romania – 400 years later. Fine vessels made on fast potter's wheels disappeared and hand-made pottery became dominant from the 450s. Burial rites changed more than once from cremation to inhumation and vice versa until inhumation became dominant by the end of the 10th century.

The East Germanic Goths and Gepids, who lived in sedentary communities, were the first new arrivals. The Goths dominated Moldavia and Wallachia from the 290s, and parts of Transylvania from the 330s. Their power collapsed under attacks by the nomadic Huns in 376. The Huns controlled Eastern and Central Europe from around 400, but their empire disintegrated in 454. Thereafter the regions west of the Carpathian Mountains – Banat, Crișana, and Transylvania – and Oltenia were dominated by the Gepids. Within a century, the lands east of the mountains became important centers of the Antes and Sclavenes. Hydronyms and place names of Slavic origin also prove the one-time presence of Early Slavs in the regions west of the Carpathians.

The nomadic Avars subjugated the Gepids in 568 and dominated the Carpathian Basin up until around 800. The Bulgars also established a powerful empire in the 670s which included Dobruja and other territories along the Lower Danube. Bulgaria officially adopted the Eastern Orthodox variant of Christianity in 864. An armed conflict between Bulgaria and the nomadic Hungarians forced the latter to depart from the Pontic steppes and began the conquest of the Carpathian Basin around 895. Their invasion gave rise to the earliest reference, recorded some centuries later in the Gesta Hungarorum, to a polity ruled by a Romanian duke named Gelou. The same source also makes mention of the presence of the Székelys in Crișana around 895. The first contemporaneous references to Romanians – who used to be known as Vlachs – in the regions now forming Romania were recorded in the 12th and 13th centuries. References to Vlachs inhabiting the lands to the south of the Lower Danube abound in the same period.

Banat, Crișana, and Transylvania were integrated into the Kingdom of Hungary in the 11th century. These regions were subject to plundering raids by the nomadic Pechenegs and Cumans, who dominated the lowlands east of the mountains. Hungarian monarchs promoted the immigration of Western European settlers to Transylvania from the 1150s. The settlers' descendants, who were known as Transylvanian Saxons from the early 13th century, received collective privileges in 1224. Because of the settlement of the Saxons in their former territories, the Székelys were moved to the easternmost zones of the kingdom. The emergence of the Mongol Empire in the Eurasian Steppes in the first decades of the 13th century had lasting effects on the history of the region. The Mongols subjugated the Cumans in the 1230s and destroyed many settlements throughout the Kingdom of Hungary in 1241 and 1242, bringing the Early Middle Ages to an end.

== Background ==
=== Roman provinces and native tribes ===
Roman provinces in the regions now forming Romania in the 2nd century AD

Contacts between the Roman Empire – which developed into the largest empire in the history of Europe – and the natives of the regions now forming Romania commenced in the 2nd century BC. These regions were inhabited by Dacians, Bastarnae and other peoples whose incursions posed a threat to the empire. The Romans initially attempted to secure their frontiers by various means, including the creation of buffer zones. Finally, they decided that the annexation of the lands of these fierce "barbarians" was the best measure. The territory of the Getae between the river Danube and the Black Sea (modern Dobruja) was the first region to be incorporated into the empire. It was attached to the Roman province of Moesia in 46 AD.

The Lower Danube marked the boundary between the empire and "Barbaricum" until Emperor Trajan decided to expand the frontiers over territories controlled by the Dacian Kingdom. He achieved his goal through two military campaigns, the second of which ended with the annihilation of the Dacian state and the establishment of the province of Dacia in 106. It included Oltenia and large portions of Banat, Transylvania, and Wallachia. Many settlers "from all over the Roman world" arrived and settled in the new province in the following decades.

Dacia was situated over the empire's natural borders. Dacia was surrounded by native tribes inhabiting the regions of Crișana, Maramureș, and Moldavia, which are now part of Romania. Dacia province was plundered by neighboring tribes, including the Carpians and Sarmatians from the 230s, and by the Goths from the 250s. As the frontiers were to be shortened for defensive purposes, the withdrawal of the Roman legions from Dacia began in the 260s. The province officially ceased to exist under Emperor Aurelian (270–275) who "withdrew the Romans from the cities and countryside of Dacia". Garrisons stationed in Drobeta and Sucidava remained on the northern bank of the river.

=== Origin of the Romanians ===
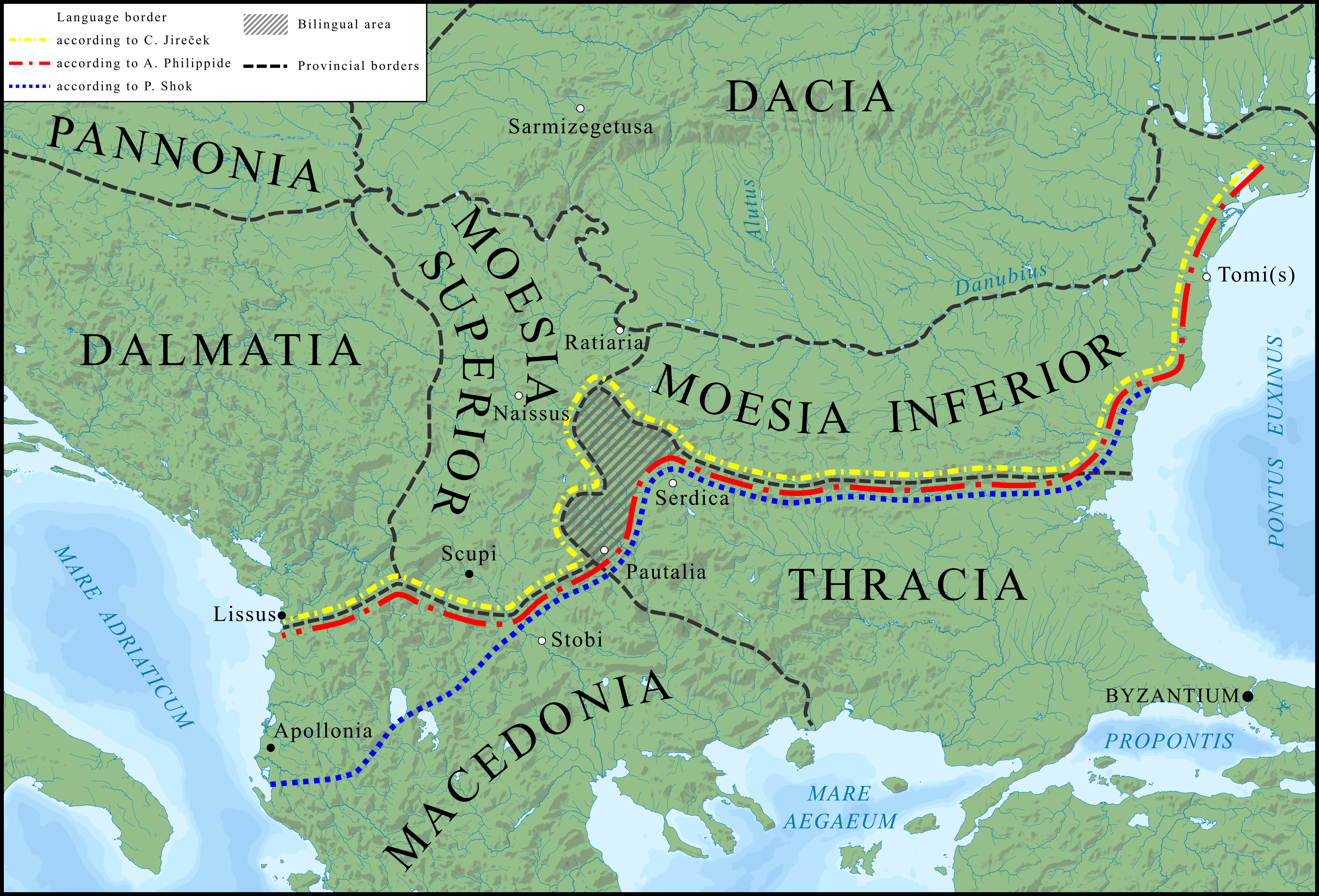
The "Jireček Line"

Romanians speak a language originating from the dialects of the Roman provinces north of the "Jireček Line". This line divided, in Roman times, the predominantly Greek-speaking southern provinces from those where Latin was the principal language of communication. The emergence of Proto-Romanian from Vulgar Latin is first demonstrated by the words "torna, torna, frater" ("turn around, turn around, brother") recorded in connection with an Eastern Roman military action in 587 or 588. The soldier shouting them "in his native tongue" spoke an Eastern Romance dialect of the Balkan Mountains.

Grigore Nandris writes that the Romanian vocabulary suggests that the Romanians' ancestors were "reduced to a pastoral life in the mountains and to agricultural pursuits in the foothills of their pasture lands" following the collapse of the Roman rule. A great number of Romanian words of uncertain origin are related to animal husbandry: baci ("chief shepherd"), balegă ("dung"), and brânză ("cheese"), for instance, belong to this group. Many words related to a more settled form of animal husbandry were borrowed from Slavic, including coteţ ("poultry house"), grajd ("stable"), and stână ("fenced pasture"). Romanian has preserved Latin terms for agriculture and the Latin names of certain crops, but a significant part of its agricultural lexis originates from a Slavic-speaking population. The first group includes a ara ("to plough"), a semăna ("to sow"), a culege ("to harvest"), a secera ("to reap"), grâu ("wheat"), in ("flax"), and furcă ("pitchfork"), while a croi ("to cut out"), a plivi ("to weed"), brazdă ("furrow"), cobilă ("plow line"), coasă ("scythe"), lopată ("shovel") and many others are Slavic loanwords.

The Romanian religious vocabulary is also divided, with a small number of basic terms preserved from Latin and a significant number of borrowings from Old Church Slavonic. Romanian did not preserve Latin words connected to urbanized society.

The Romanians' ethnogenesis cannot be understood based exclusively on written sources, because the earliest records on their ancestors were made by 11th-century Byzantine historians. When referring to the Romance-speaking population of Southeastern Europe, early medieval sources used the Vlach exonym or its cognates, which all derived from the Common Slavic term for speakers of the Latin language. The earliest sources write of the Vlachs of the central territories of the Balkan Peninsula.

== Late Roman Age ==
=== Scythia Minor and the limes on the Lower Danube (c. 270–c. 700) ===
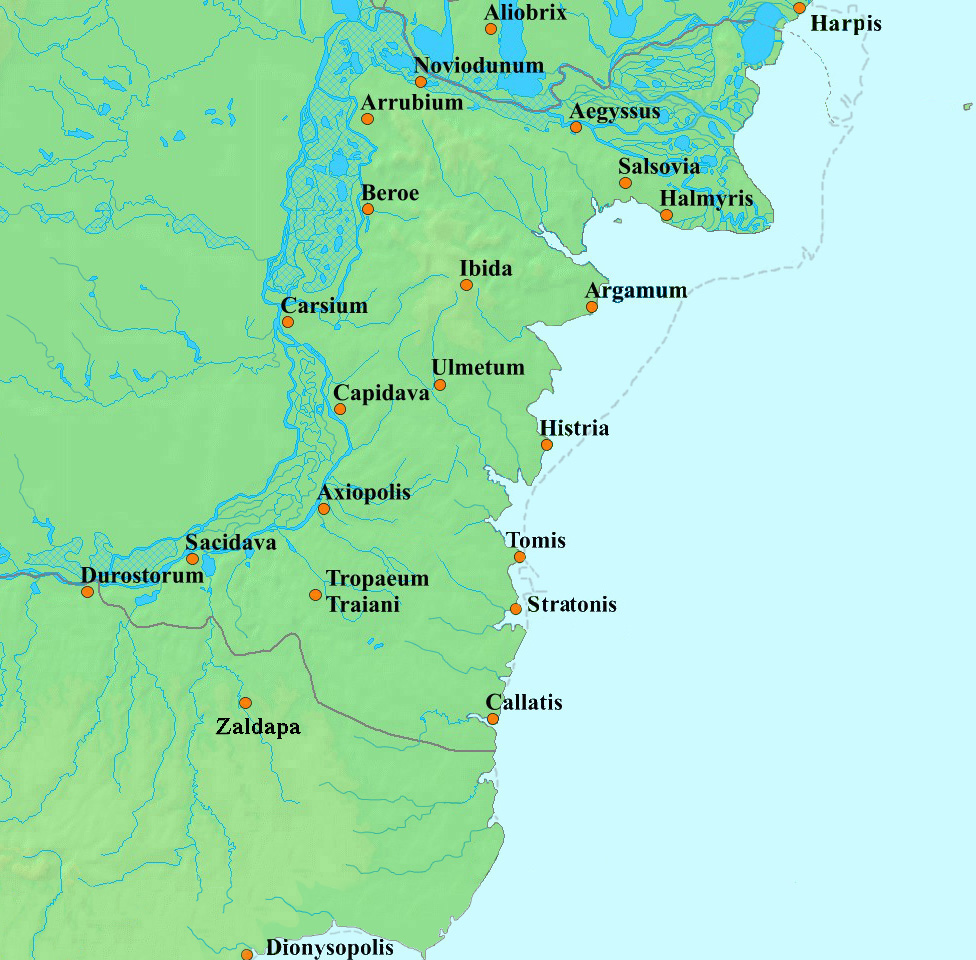
Scythia Minor: a Late Roman province formed through the division of the former province of Lower Moesia around 293

The territory between the Lower Danube and the Black Sea remained a fully integrated part of the Roman Empire, even after the abandonment of Trajan's Dacia. It was transformed into a separate province under the name of Scythia Minor around 293. Before 300, the Romans erected small forts at Dierna and in other places on the northern bank of the Danube in modern-day Banat. In their wider region, Roman coins from the period—mostly of bronze—have been found.

The existence of Christian communities in Scythia Minor became evident under Emperor Diocletian (284–305). He and his co-emperors ordered the persecution of Christians throughout the empire, causing the death of many between 303 and 313. Under Emperor Constantine the Great (306–337), a bridge across the Danube was constructed at Sucidava, a new fort (Constantiana Daphne) was built, and ancient roads were repaired in Oltenia. The Lower Danube again became the empire's northern boundary in 369 at the latest, when Emperor Valens met Athanaric—the head of the Goths—in a boat in the middle of the river because the latter had taken an oath "never to set foot on Roman soil".

The Huns destroyed Drobeta and Sucidava in the 440s, but the forts were restored under Emperor Justinian I (527–565). Eastern Roman coins from the first half of the 6th century suggest a significant military presence in Oltenia—a region also characterized by the predominance of pottery with shapes of Roman tradition. Although Eastern Roman emperors made annual payments to the neighboring peoples in an attempt to keep the peace in the Balkans, the Avars regularly invaded Scythia Minor from the 580s. The Romans abandoned Sucidava in 596 or 597, but Tomis, which was the last town in Scythia Minor to resist the invaders, only fell in 704.

=== North of the limes (c. 270 – c. 330) ===
Transylvania and northern Banat, which had belonged to Dacia province, had no direct contact with the Roman Empire from the 270s. There is no evidence that they were invaded in the following decades. Towns, including Apulum and Ulpia Traiana Sarmizegetusa, and the surrounding areas continued to be inhabited but the urban areas diminished. The existence of local Christian communities can be assumed in Porolissum, Potaissa and other settlements. On the other hand, evidence – mainly pottery with "Chi-rho" (Χ-Ρ) signs and other Christian symbols – is "shadowy and poorly understood", according to archaeologists Haynes and Hanson.

Urns found in late 3rd-century cemeteries at Bezid, Mediaş, and in other Transylvanian settlements had clear analogies in sites east of the Carpathians, suggesting that the Carpians were the first new arrivals in the former province from the neighboring regions. Other Carpian groups, pressured by the Goths, also departed from their homeland and sought refuge in the Roman Empire around 300. Nevertheless, "Carpo-Dacians" were listed among the peoples "mixed with the Huns" as late as 379. The Sarmatians of the Banat were allies of the empire, demonstrated by a Roman invasion in 332 against the Goths, their enemies. Sarmatians were admitted into the empire in 379, but other Sarmatian groups remained in the Tisa plains up until the 460s.

=== Gutthiuda: land of the Goths (c. 290 – c. 455) ===
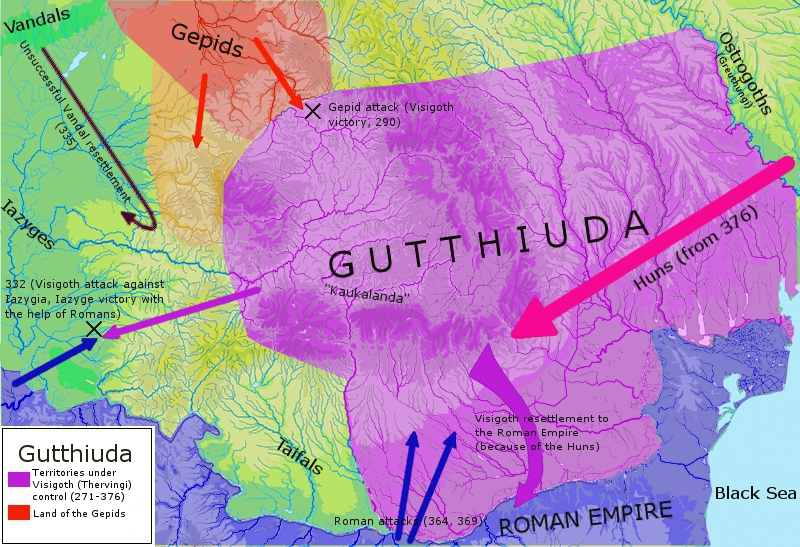
Gutthiuda, the country of Thervingi

The Goths started penetrating into territories west of the river Dniester from the 230s. Two distinct groups separated by the river, the Thervingi and the Greuthungi, quickly emerged among them. The one-time province of Dacia was held by "the Taifali, Victohali, and Thervingi" around 350.

The Goths' success is marked by the expansion of the multiethnic "Sântana de Mureş-Chernyakhov culture". Settlements of the culture appeared in Moldavia and Wallachia at the end of the 3rd century, and in Transylvania after 330. These lands were inhabited by a sedentary population engaged in farming and cattle-breeding. Pottery, comb-making and other handicrafts flourished in the villages. Wheel-made fine pottery is a typical item of the period; hand-formed cups of the local tradition were also preserved. Plowshares similar to those made in nearby Roman provinces and Scandinavian-style brooches indicate trade contacts with these regions. "Sântana de Mureş-Chernyakhov" villages, sometimes covering an area exceeding 20 hectares (49 acres), were not fortified and consisted of two types of houses: sunken huts with walls made of wattle and daub and surface buildings with plastered timber walls. Sunken huts had for centuries been typical for settlements east of the Carpathians, but now they appeared in distant zones of the Pontic steppes.

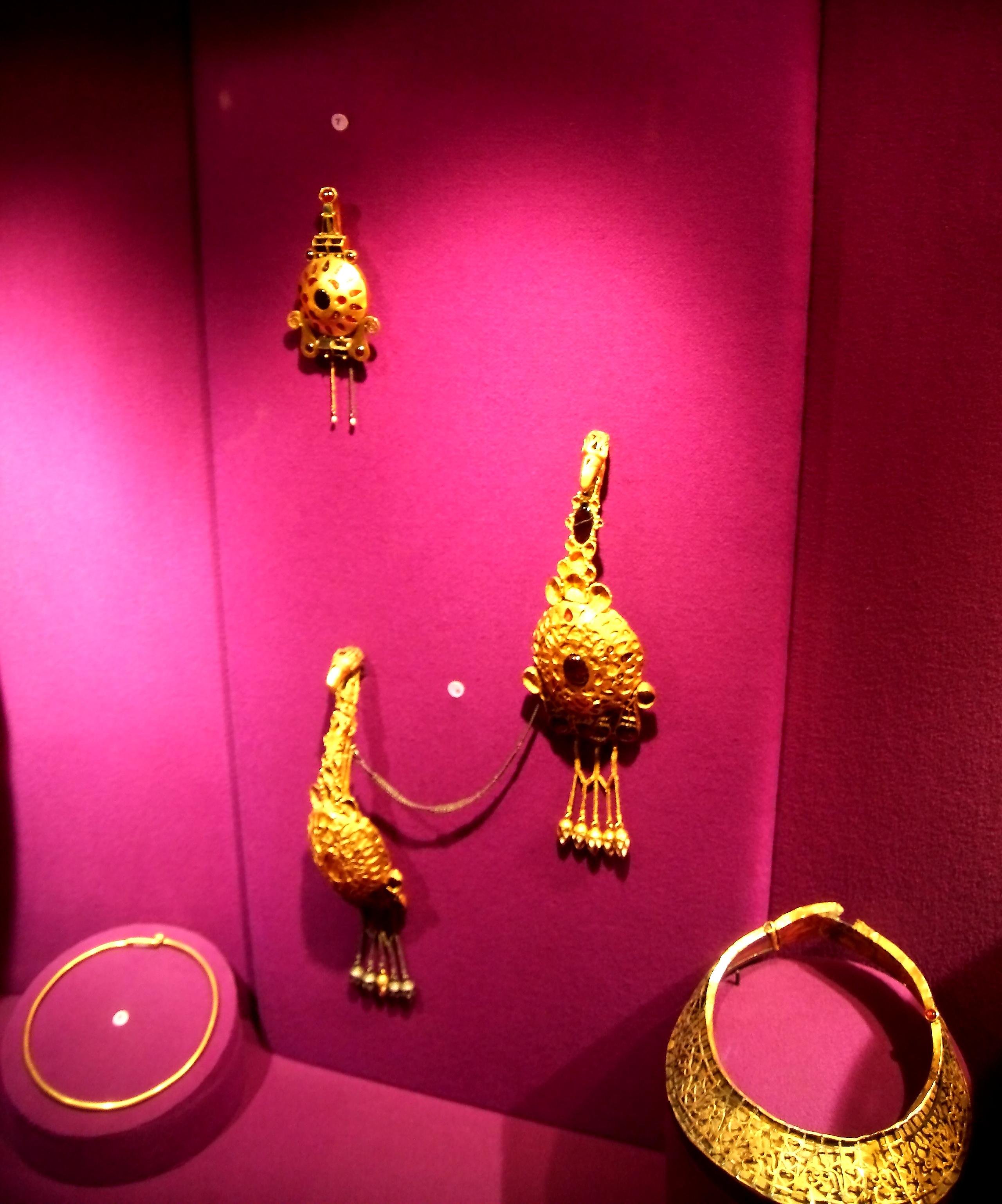
Pieces of the Pietroasele Treasure

The multiethnic Gutthiuda was divided into smaller political units or kuni, each headed by tribal chiefs or reiks. In case of emergency, the tribal chiefs' council elected a supreme leader who was known as iudex regum ("judge of kings") by St Ambrose. Christian prisoners of war were the first missionaries among the Goths. Ulfilas, himself a descendant of a Cappadocian captive, was ordained bishop "of the Christians in the land of the Goths" in 341. Expelled from Gutthiuda during a persecution of Christians, Ulfilas settled in Moesia in 348.

Gothic dominance collapsed when the Huns arrived and attacked the Thervingi in 376. Most of the Thervingi sought asylum in the Roman Empire, and were followed by large groups of Greuthungi and Taifali. All the same, significant groups of Goths stayed in the territories north of the Danube. For instance, Athanaric "retired with all his men to Caucalanda"—probably to the valley of the river Olt— from where they "drove out the Sarmatians". A hoard of Roman coins issued under Valentinian I and Valens suggests that the gates of the amphitheatre at Ulpia Traiana were blocked around the same time. The Pietroasele Treasure which was hidden around 450 also implies the presence of a Gothic tribal or religious leader in the lands between the Carpathians and the Lower Danube. It contains a torc bearing the inscription GUTANI O WI HAILAG, which is interpreted by Malcolm Todd as "God who protects the Goths, most holy and inviolate".

=== Gepidia: land of the Gepids (c. 290 – c. 630) ===
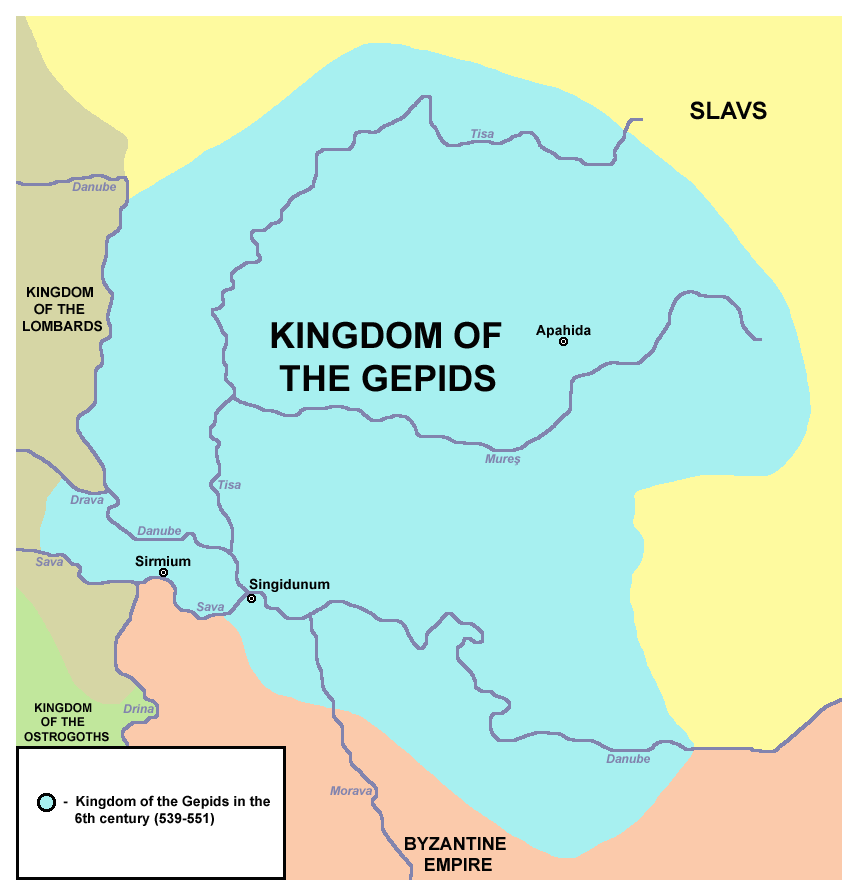
Gepidia at its largest territorial extent

The earliest reference to Gepids – an East Germanic tribe closely related to the Goths – is found in a formal speech of 291. The anonymous author wrote that the Thervingi joined "battle with the Vandals and Gepids" at that time. The center of an early Gepidia, on the plains northwest of the Meseş Mountains, appears to have been located around Şimleu Silvaniei, where early 5th-century precious objects of Roman provenance have been unearthed.

The Huns imposed their authority over the Gepids by the 420s, but the latter remained united under the rule of their king named Ardaric. Although he was one of the favorites of Attila, king of the Huns, he initiated an uprising against the Huns when Attila died in 453. The Gepids regained their independence and "ruled as victors over the extent of all Dacia".

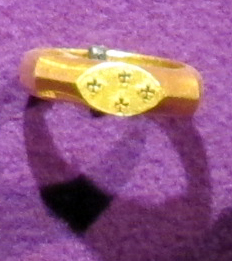
Golden ring with crosses found at Apahida Necropolis

Three sumptuous tombs found at Apahida evidence the wealth accumulated by Gepid royals through their connections with the Eastern Roman Empire. A golden ring with crosses found in one of the graves implies its owner's Christian faith. John of Biclar refers to an Arian bishop of the Gepids which suggests that they adopted Christianity through their connection with the Arian Goths.

New settlements appearing along the rivers Mureş, Someş, and Târnava reflects a period of tranquility in Gepidia until around 568. The common people in Biharia, Cenad, Moreşti, and other villages lived in sunken huts covered with gabled roofs but with no hearths or ovens. They were primarily farmers, but looms, combs, and other products evidence the existence of local workshops. Trading contacts between Gepidia and faraway regions is evidenced by finds of amber beads and brooches manufactured in the Crimea, Mazovia or Scandinavia.

The Avar invasion of 568 ended the independent Gepidia. Written sources evidence the survival of Gepid groups within the Avar Empire. For instance, Eastern Roman troops "encountered three Gepid settlements" on the Tisa plains in 599 or 600.

=== Hunnic Empire (c. 400 – c. 460) ===
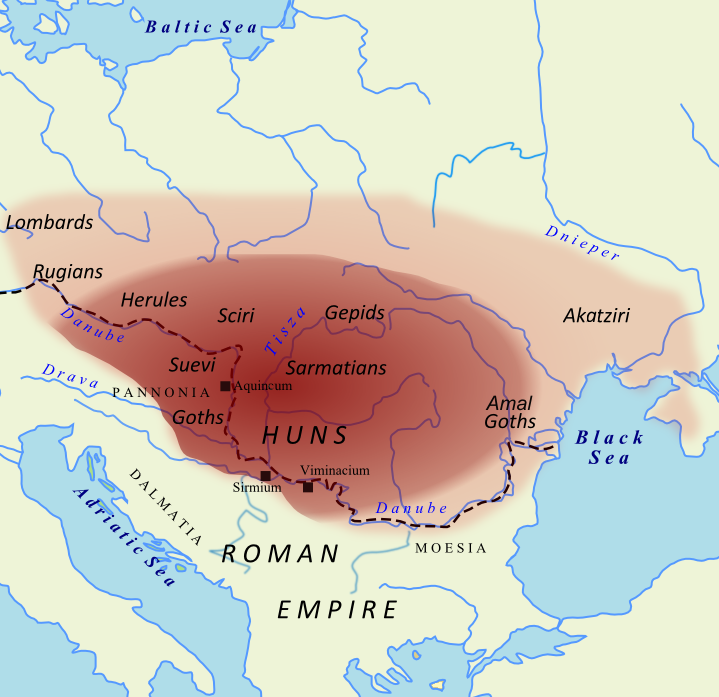
The Hunnic Empire around 450

The Huns, a people of uncertain origin, were nomadic and wandered "with the wagons" in the 370s. They were eminent mounted archers who imposed their authority over an increasing number of neighboring peoples. Their first ruler whose seat was located in the Lower Danube region was Uldin, initially an important ally and later an enemy of the Eastern Roman Empire between 401 and 408.

The Eastern Roman government paid an annual tribute to the Huns from the 420s. Gold flowing from the empire transformed the Hun society. The introduction of a centralized monarchy is evidenced in a report written by Priscus of Panium, an Eastern Roman envoy sent to the ruler of the Huns, Attila, in 448. At that time, Gothic was widely spoken in the royal court since "the subjects of the Huns" spoke "besides their own barbarous tongues, either Hunnic or Gothic, or—as many as have commercial dealings with the western Romans—Latin".

The Huns imposed their authority on a sedentary population. Priscus of Panium refers to a village where he and his retinue were supplied "with millet instead of corn" and "medos (mead) instead of wine". Attila's sudden death in 453 caused a civil war among his sons. The subject peoples revolted and emerged the victors at the Battle of Nedao in 454. The remnants of the Huns withdrew to the Pontic steppes. One of their groups was admitted to settle in Scythia Minor in 460.

== After the first migrations ==
=== Between Huns and Avars (c. 460 – c. 565) ===
The last "Sântana de Mureş-Chernyakhov" objects once widespread in Gutthiuda – such as fine wares and weapons – are dated to the period ending around 430. According to Coriolan H. Opreanu, the same period is characterized by "population shifts" which caused the abandonment of many villages and the appearance of new settlements. Botoşana, Dodeşti, and other sites east of the Carpathians demonstrate the simplification of pottery forms and a decline in the use of the fast potter's wheel from the 450s. Around the same time, semi-sunken huts with stone or clay ovens appeared in Moldavia and Wallachia, forming ephemeral settlements with an area smaller than 5 hectares (12 acres). The locals practiced an "itinerant form of agriculture", instead of manuring the soil. Differences in local pottery indicate the coexistence of communities isolated from each other by marshes, forests or hills. For instance, contemporary Cândeşti produced a significant quantity of wheel-made pottery, Târgşor was characterized by crushed-shard tempered vessels, and a sample of the most common "Kolochin" vessels was found in the Budureasca Valley.

There are few known cemeteries from the second half of the 5th century, pointing to common use of cremation without the use of urns or pits. On the other hand, a huge biritual necropolis at Sărata-Monteoru produced more than 1,600 cremation burials, either in wheel-made urns or in pits without urns. Small cemeteries with inhumation graves have been found at Nichiteni and Secuieni.

Jordanes, Procopius and other 6th-century authors used the terms "Sclavenes" and "Antes" to refer to the peoples inhabiting the territory north of the Lower Danube. The Antes launched their first campaign over the Lower Danube in 518. After they concluded a treaty with the Eastern Roman Empire in 545, the Sclavenes started to plunder the Balkan provinces. Both ethnic groups seized many prisoners of wars during their raids, but they were ready to integrate them "as free men and friends".

The names of early 6th-century leaders of the Sclavenes or Antes are unknown. This supports ancient authors' claims that both ethnic groups lived "under a democracy". The same conclusion can be drawn from Procopius's report of the "phoney Chilbudius" – a young Antian serf who "spoke the Latin tongue" – who was dispatched by his fellow tribesmen to negotiate with the Eastern Roman Empire in 545.

The disappearance of bronze and gold coins from sites north of the Lower Danube demonstrates an "economic closure of the frontier" of the Eastern Roman Empire between 545 and 565. The same period is characterized by a tendency towards cultural unification in Moldavia, Oltenia and Wallachia. Handmade pots with very similar incised designs evidence the "existence of a cross-regional set of symbols shared" by either potters or consumers. Pots, spindle whorls and other objects decorated with crosses or swastikas have been unearthed at Cândeşti, Lozna, and other sites. The use of handmade clay pans for baking bread was spreading from the regions south and east of the Carpathians towards lands over the Dniester and the Lower Danube.

=== Avar Empire (c. 565 – c. 800) ===
The Avars occupied Gepidia in 567, less than a decade after their arrival in Europe. They were nomadic pastoralists, who settled in the lowlands. Stirrups found at Sânpetru German are among the earliest finds in Romania attributed to the Avars. They received agricultural products from farming communities settled in their domains and neighboring peoples subjected to their authority. Emperor Justin II hired, in 578, the Avars to attack the Sclavenes who resumed their plundering raids against the empire around that time. The names of some of the Sclavene leaders were first recorded in the following period. One of them, Musocius, "was called rex in the barbarian tongue".

Graves of males interred together with horses found at Aiud and Band prove the Avars' settlement in Transylvania in the early 7th century. Their cemeteries are centered around salt mines. Spurs—never found in Avar context but widely used in Western Slav territories— were unearthed in Şura Mică and Medişoru Mare, suggesting the employment of non-Avar horsemen in the 8th century.

Large "Late Avar" cemeteries used by several generations between c. 700 and c. 800 imply "an advanced degree of sedentization" of the entire society. The Avar Empire collapsed after the Franks launched three campaigns against the westernmost Avar territories between 791 and 803. Soon afterwards the Bulgars attacked the Avars from the southeast, and Charlemagne settled Avar groups in Pannonia.

=== Emergence of new powers (c. 600 – c. 895) ===
The Lower Danube region experienced a period of stability after the establishment of the Avar Empire. Archaeological sites in Moldavia, Oltenia and Wallachia became characterized by the growing popularity of hand-made vessels with finger impressions and by a decline in detectable cemeteries. Ananias of Shirak, a 7th-century Armenian geographer described the "large country of Dacia" as inhabited by Slavs who formed "twenty-five tribes".

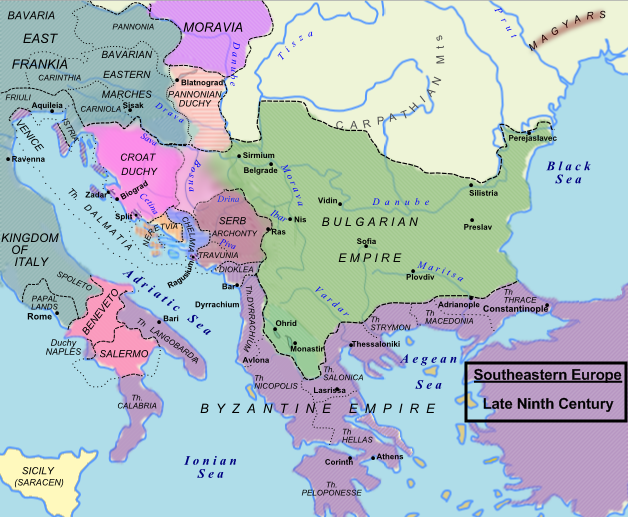
The Bulgarian lands across the Danube in the ninth century, after the territorial expansion under Krum, Omurtag and Presian

Villages of sunken huts with stone ovens appeared in Transylvania around 600. Their network was expanding along the rivers Mureş, Olt and Someş. The so-called "Mediaş group" of cremation or mixed cemeteries emerged in this period near salt mines. The Hungarian and the Romanian vocabulary of salt mining was taken from Slavic, suggesting that Slavs were employed in the mines for centuries. Bistriţa ("swift"), Crasna ("nice" or "red"), Sibiu ("dogwood"), and many other rivers and settlements with names of Slavic origin also evidence the presence of Slavs in Transylvania.

The Turkic-speaking Bulgars arrived in the territories west of the river Dniester around 670. At the Battle of Ongal they defeated the Eastern Roman (or Byzantine) Emperor Constantine IV in 680 or 681, occupied Dobruja and founded the First Bulgarian Empire. They soon imposed their authority over some of the neighboring tribes. The great variety in burial rites evidences the multi-ethnic character of the Bulgarian Empire. Even the Bulgars were divided in this respect; some of them practiced inhumation and others cremation. Initially, a sharp distinction existed between the Bulgars and their subjects, but the Slavicization of the Bulgars soon began.

Opreanu writes that the "new cultural synthesis" known as the "Dridu culture" developed in the Lower Danube region around 680. New settlements and large cemeteries show that the region experienced a steady demographic rise in the 8th century. The large, unfortified "Dridu" settlements were characterized by traditional semi-sunken huts, but a few houses with ground-level floors have also been unearthed in Dodeşti, Spinoasa, and other places.

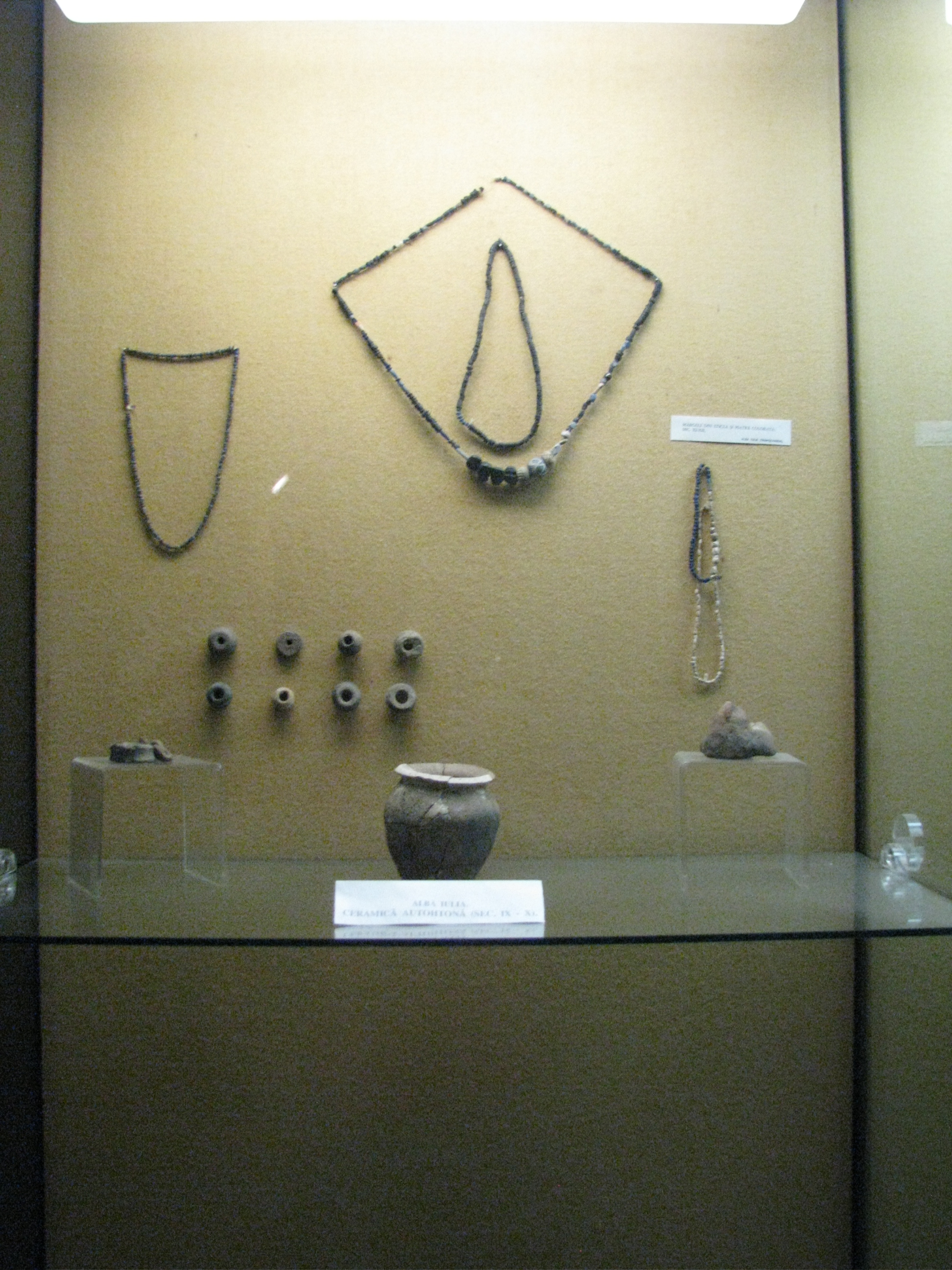
9th-11th-century ceramics and objects from Alba Iulia area, in display at the National Museum of the Union

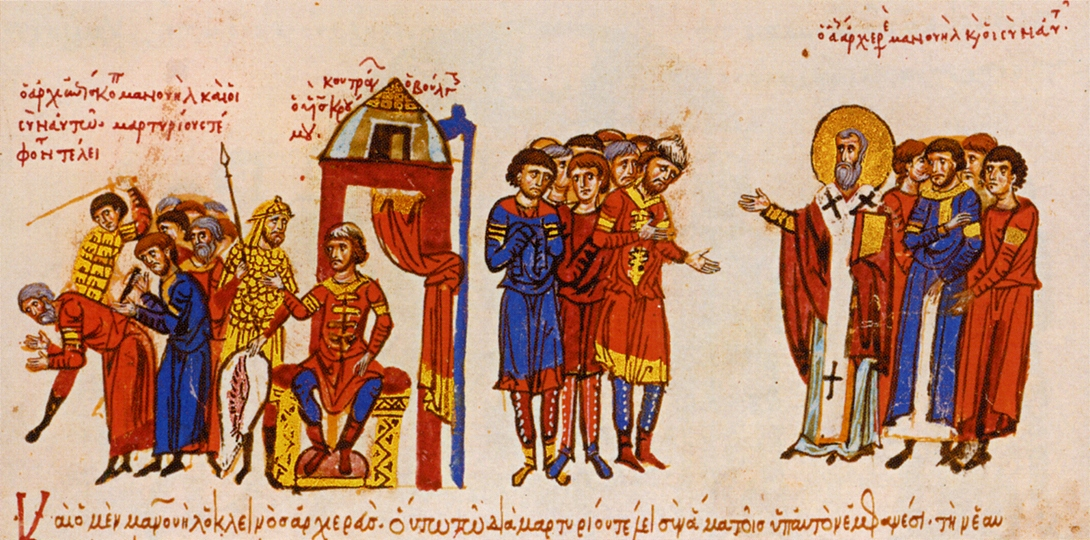
Omurtag orders the persecution of Christians in his empire

"Dridu" communities produced and used gray or yellow fine pottery, but hand-made vessels were still predominant. Fine, gray vessels were also unearthed in the 9th-century "Blandiana A" cemeteries in the area of Alba-Iulia, which constitutes a "cultural enclave" in Transylvania. Near these cemeteries, necropolises of graves with west–east orientation form the distinct "Ciumbrud group". Female dress accessories from "Ciumbrud graves" are strikingly similar to those from Christian cemeteries in Bulgaria and Moravia. From an earlier date are the cremation cemeteries of the "Nuşfalau-Someşeni group" in northwestern Transylvania, with their 8th- and 9th-century tumuli, similar to the kurgans of East Slavic territories.

Contemporaneous authors rarely dwelled on early medieval Southeastern Europe. For instance, the Royal Frankish Annals makes a passing reference to Abodrites living "in Dacia adjacent to the Danube near the Bulgarian border" on the occasion of their envoys' arrival in Aachen in 824. Bulgaria's territory increased under Krum (c. 803–814), who took Adrianople and forced at least 10,000 of the town's inhabitants to settle north of the Lower Danube in 813. The ambitions of his son Omurtag (814–831) in the regions of the rivers Dnieper and Tisa are attested by two columns erected in the memory of Bulgar military leaders who drowned in these rivers during military campaigns. Emperor Arnulf sent envoys, in 894, to the Bulgarians to "ask that they should not sell salt to the Moravians", suggesting a Bulgarian control over either the Transylvanian salt mines or the roads to Moravia.

In the same year, the nomadic Hungarians – who had arrived in the Lower Danube region from the steppes of Eastern Europe in 837 or 838 – became involved in a conflict between Bulgaria and the Byzantine Empire on the latter's behalf. The Bulgarians incited another nomadic tribe, the Pechenegs, to invade the Hungarians from the east, while the Bulgarians also attacked them from the south. The two synchronized attacks forced the Hungarians to cross the Carpathian Mountains in search for a new homeland.

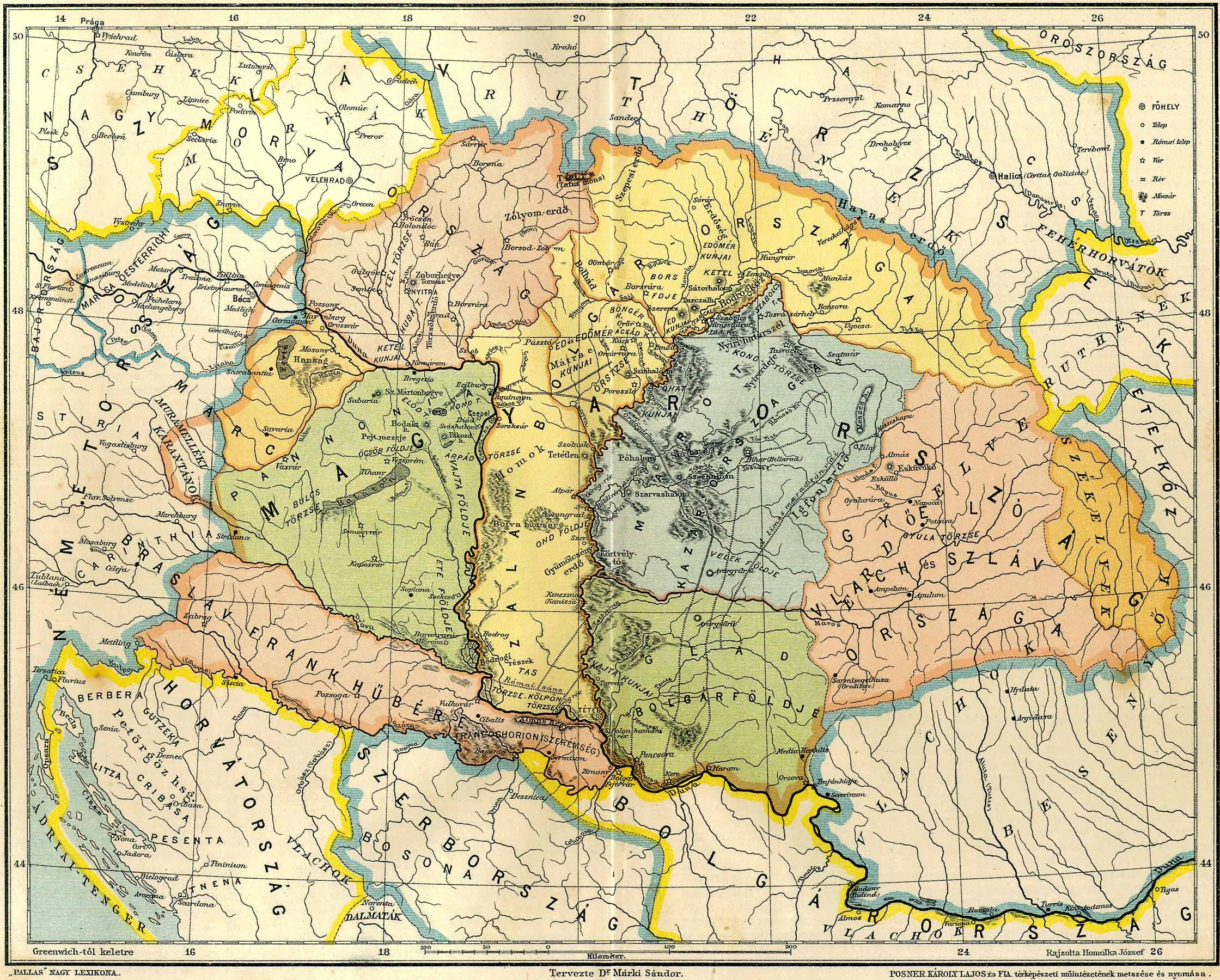
The Carpathian Basin on the eve of the "Hungarian Land-taking": a map based primarily on the narration of the Gesta Hungarorum

About 300 years later, Anonymus, the author of Gesta Hungarorum, wrote a comprehensive list of polities and peoples of the Carpathian Basin at the turn of the 9th and 10th centuries. He wrote about the Hungarian conquest of the territory but did not mention Simeon I of Bulgaria, Svatopluk of Moravia and the conquerors' opponents known from contemporary sources. Instead, he wrote of a number of personalities unknown by other chroniclers. In Gesta Hungarorum, Menumorut ruled over "the peoples that are called Kozár" in Crișana. Anonymus also wrote of the Székelys ("previously the peoples of King Attila") living in the territory for centuries who joined the invading Hungarians. Banat, according to Anonymus, was ruled by Glad who had come "from the castle of Vidin." Glad is described to employ "Cumans, Bulgarians and Vlachs" in his army. Anonymous also wrote of Gelou, "a certain Vlach" ruling in Transylvania, a land inhabited by "Vlachs and Slavs". Gelou's subjects are portrayed as having "suffered many injuries from the Cumans and Pechenegs".

== Formation of new states and the last waves of migrations ==
=== First Bulgarian Empire after conversion (864–1018) ===
Boris I, the ruler of Bulgaria, converted to Orthodox Christianity in 864. He promoted vernacular worship services, thus Old Church Slavonic was declared the language of liturgy in the Bulgarian Orthodox Church in 893. One of the earliest examples of Cyrillic script—an alphabet strongly associated with Slavonic liturgy—was found in Mircea Vodă in Romania. The Cyrillic inscription from 943 refers to a "župan Dimitrie".

Traces of Bulgarian influence in the territory of modern Romania are found mostly in the area of Wallachia. For example in sites from Bucov, Căscioarele, or Mărăcinele, water pipe fragments have been found dating to the 9th or 10th century. No building in the region from the time is known to have used them and the evidence gathered points more likely at production centres destined for exporting their goods to the Bulgarian rising urban centres of Pliska and Preslav.

Byzantine troops occupied large portions of Bulgaria, including modern Dobruja, under Emperor John I Tzimiskes (969–976). After his death an anti-Byzantine uprising led by four brothers broke out. One of the brothers, David, was killed by Vlachs in the present-day border region between Greece and North Macedonia. In 1018, the Byzantines conquered the whole territory of the Bulgarian Empire and the Archbishop of Ohrid acquired ecclesiastic jurisdiction in 1020 over the Vlachs living there.

=== Hungarians in the Carpathian Basin (c. 895 – c. 1000) ===
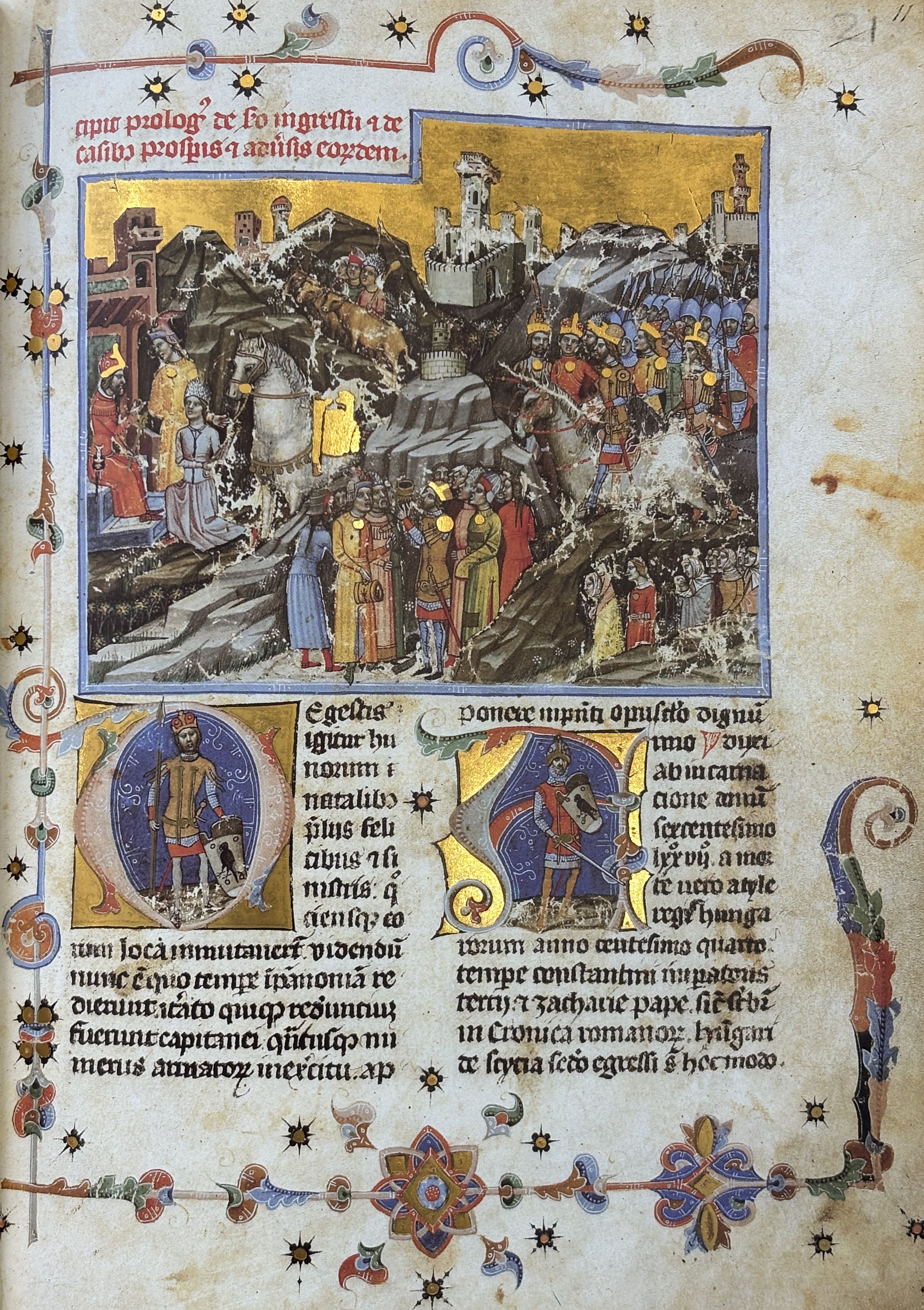
The Hungarian Conquest depicted in the Illuminated Chronicle

The way taken by the Hungarians across the Carpathian Mountains when they started the conquest of the Carpathian Basin varies from source to source. According to Gesta Hungarorum, the Hungarians descended through the northern passes to the lowlands, bypassing Transylvania, and only began the invasion of the regions east of the Tisa after the conquest of the western regions. Gesta Hungarorum says the Vlach Gelou of Transylvania died fighting the Hungarians, while his subjects chose "for themselves as lord Tétény", one of the Hungarian leaders. Anonymus also wrote of Menumorut's defeat, but said he preserved his rule in Crișana until his death by giving his daughter in marriage to Zolta, heir to Árpád, the head of the Hungarians. In a contrasting account, the Illuminated Chronicle writes of Hungarians fleeing through the eastern passes of the Carpathian Mountains to Transylvania where they "remained quietly" and "rested their herds" for a while before moving further west. The so-called "Cluj group" of small inhumation cemeteries—graves with west–east orientation, often containing remains of horses— appeared on both sides of the Apuseni Mountains around 900. Their military character evidences that the people using them formed a "double defensive line" organized against the Pechenegs. Transylvanian cemeteries of the "Cluj group" cluster around salt mines.

Emperor Constantine VII Porphyrogenitus identified "the whole settlement" of Hungary with the lands where the rivers Criş, Mureş, Timiş, Tisa and Toutis–possibly the Bega—ran around 950. The concentration of objects of Byzantine provenance at the confluence of the Mureş and Tisa shows that this territory was a regional center of power. Accordingly, the seat of Gyula, a Hungarian chieftain baptized in Constantinople around 952, most probably existed in this region. On the other hand, Hungarian chronicles associate Gyula's family with Transylvania. Place names from the nomadic stratum of Hungarian toponymy—those corresponding to proper names or Hungarian tribal names, including Decea, Hotoan, and Ineu— also evidence that major Hungarian groups settled in Transylvania from the 950s. An early "Bijelo Brdo" cemetery belonging to a 10th- and 11th-century archaeological culture with finds from all over the Carpathian Basin was found at Deva.

=== Patzinakia: land of the Pechenegs (c. 895 – c. 1120) ===
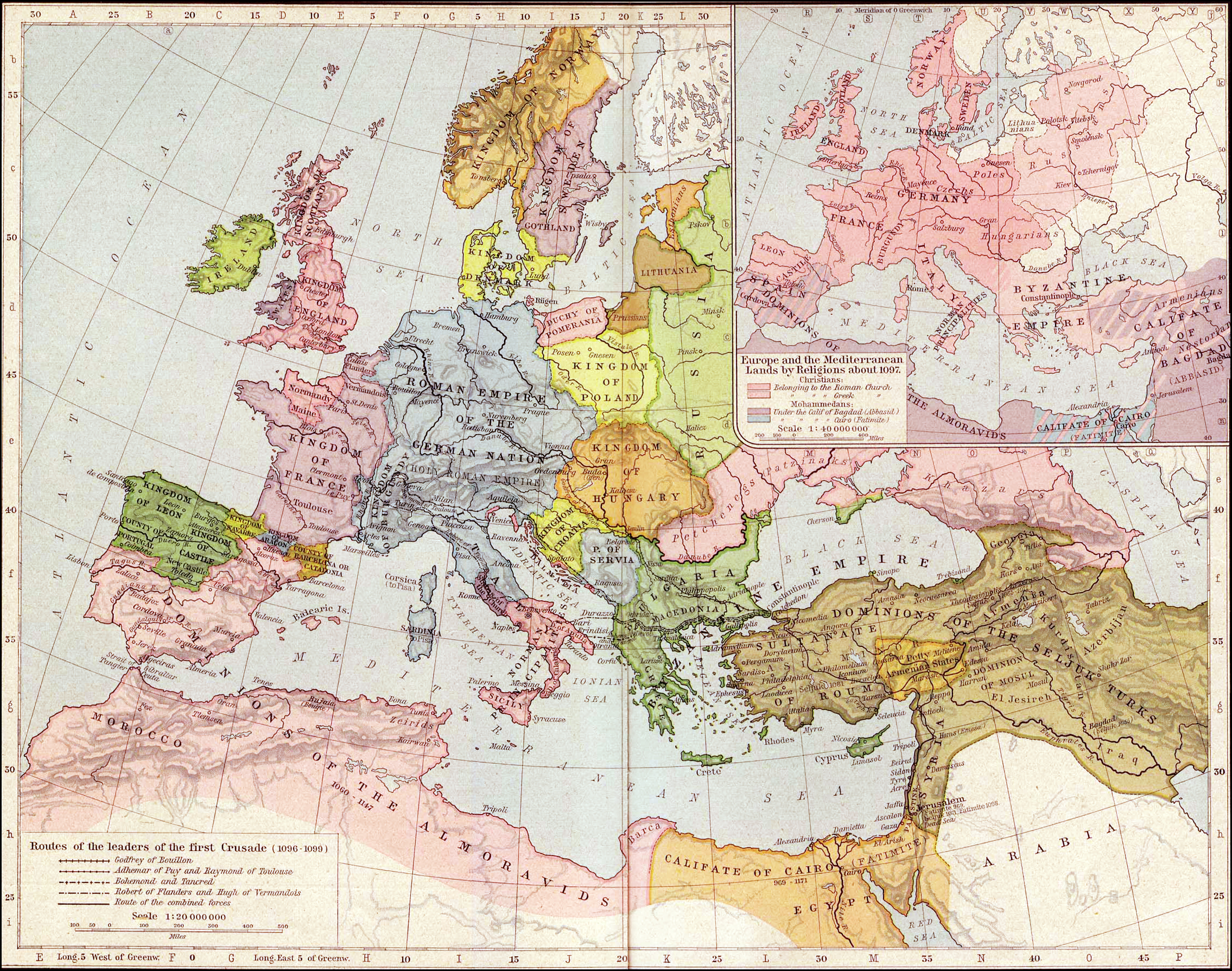
Europe in 1097

The Turkic-speaking Pechenegs took the control of the territories east of the Carpathians from the Hungarians around 895. Emperor Constantine VII wrote that two Pecheneg "provinces" or "clans" ("Kato Gyla" and "Giazichopon") were located in Moldavia and Wallachia around 950. The change of dominion had no major effect on the sedentary "Dridu" villages in the region. The settlements in Moldavia and Wallachia, most of them built on river banks or lake shores, remained unfortified. Sporadic finds of horse brasses and other "nomadic" objects evidence the presence of Pechenegs in "Dridu" communities. Snaffle bits with rigid mouthpieces and round stirrups—novelties of the early 10th century—were also unearthed in Moldavia and Wallachia. Cemeteries of the locals show that inhumation replaced cremation by the end of the 10th century.

The Eymund's saga narrates that Pechenegs (Tyrkir) with Blökumen "and a good many other nasty people" were involved in the disputes for the throne of Kievan Rus' in 1019. An 11th-century runic inscription on a stone from Gotland narrates that a Varangian man was murdered "on a voyage abroad" by Blakumen. Both Blökumen and Blakumen may refer to Vlachs inhabiting the regions east of the Carpathians, although their translation to "black men" cannot be excluded. Graffiti depicting ships and dragons in Scandinavian style were found in the Basarabi Cave Complex at Murfatlar.

Large groups of Pechenegs pressured from the east by the Ouzes received asylum in the Byzantine Empire in 1046 and 1047. All the same, Pecheneg populations remained in the regions north of the Lower Danube even thereafter. Some of them were admitted into the Kingdom of Hungary in the next decades, where they were settled in southern Transylvania and other regions.

=== Byzantine revival and the Second Bulgarian Empire (970s – c. 1185) ===
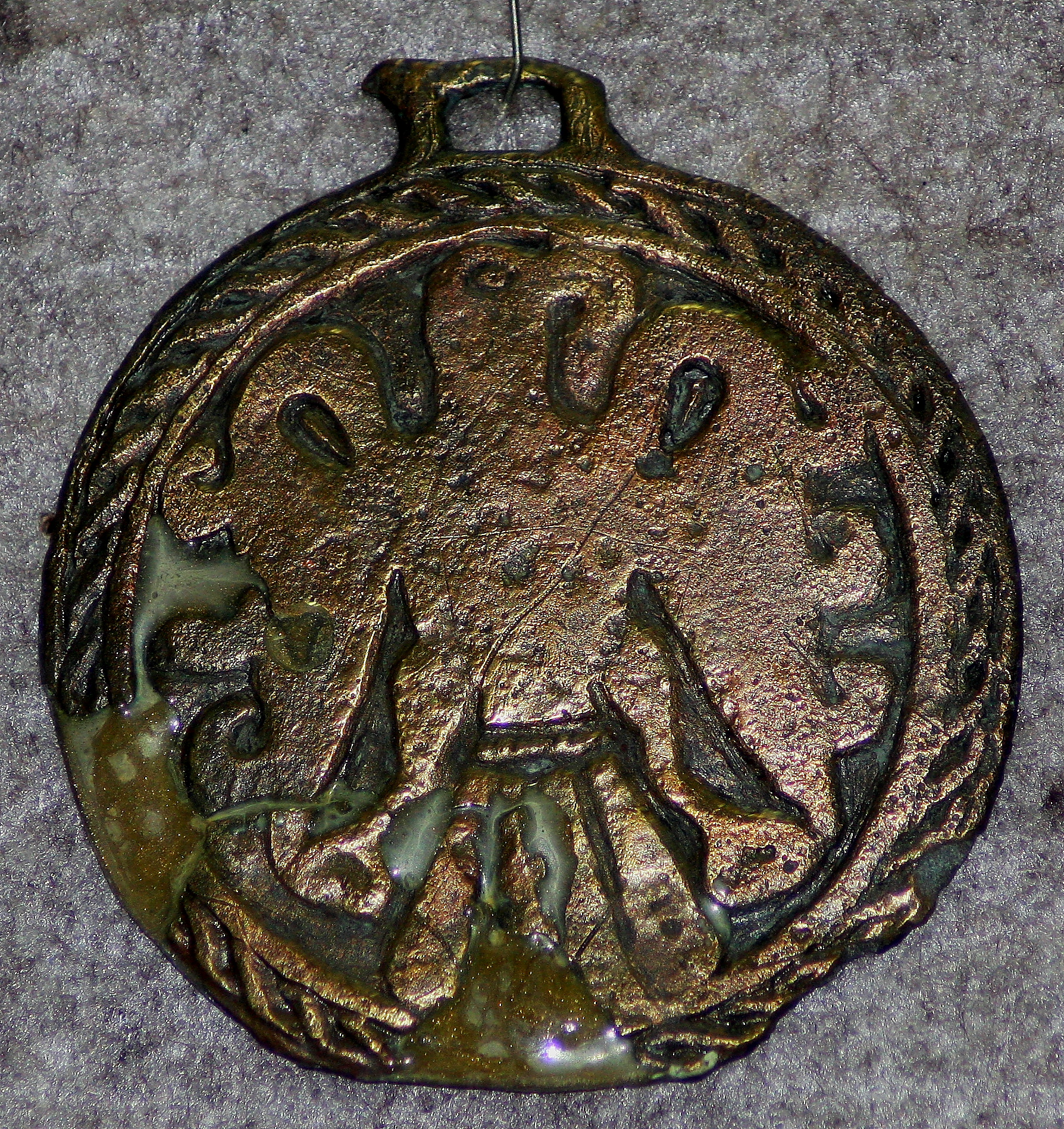
A pendant discovered at the Byzantine fortress from Păcuiul lui Soare

Around 971, Emperor John I Tzimiskes established the theme or "district" of Paristrion in the territories occupied between the Balkan Mountains and the Lower Danube. Naval bases were built at Capidava, Noviodunum, and Păcuiul lui Soare on the river. Bulgarians and Vlachs living in the annexed territories often expressed their hostility towards imperial rule. Anna Comnena relates how local Vlachs showed "the way through the passes" of the Balkan Mountains to invading Cumans in 1094. All the same, Vlachs served in the imperial army, for instance during an imperial campaign against the Kingdom of Hungary in 1166. New taxes imposed by imperial authorities caused a rebellion of Vlachs and Bulgarians in 1185, which led to the establishment of the Second Bulgarian Empire. The Vlachs' eminent status within the new state is evidenced by the writings of Robert of Clari and other western authors, who refer either to the new state or to its mountainous regions as "Vlachia" until the 1250s.

=== Kingdom of Hungary (c. 1000 – 1241) ===
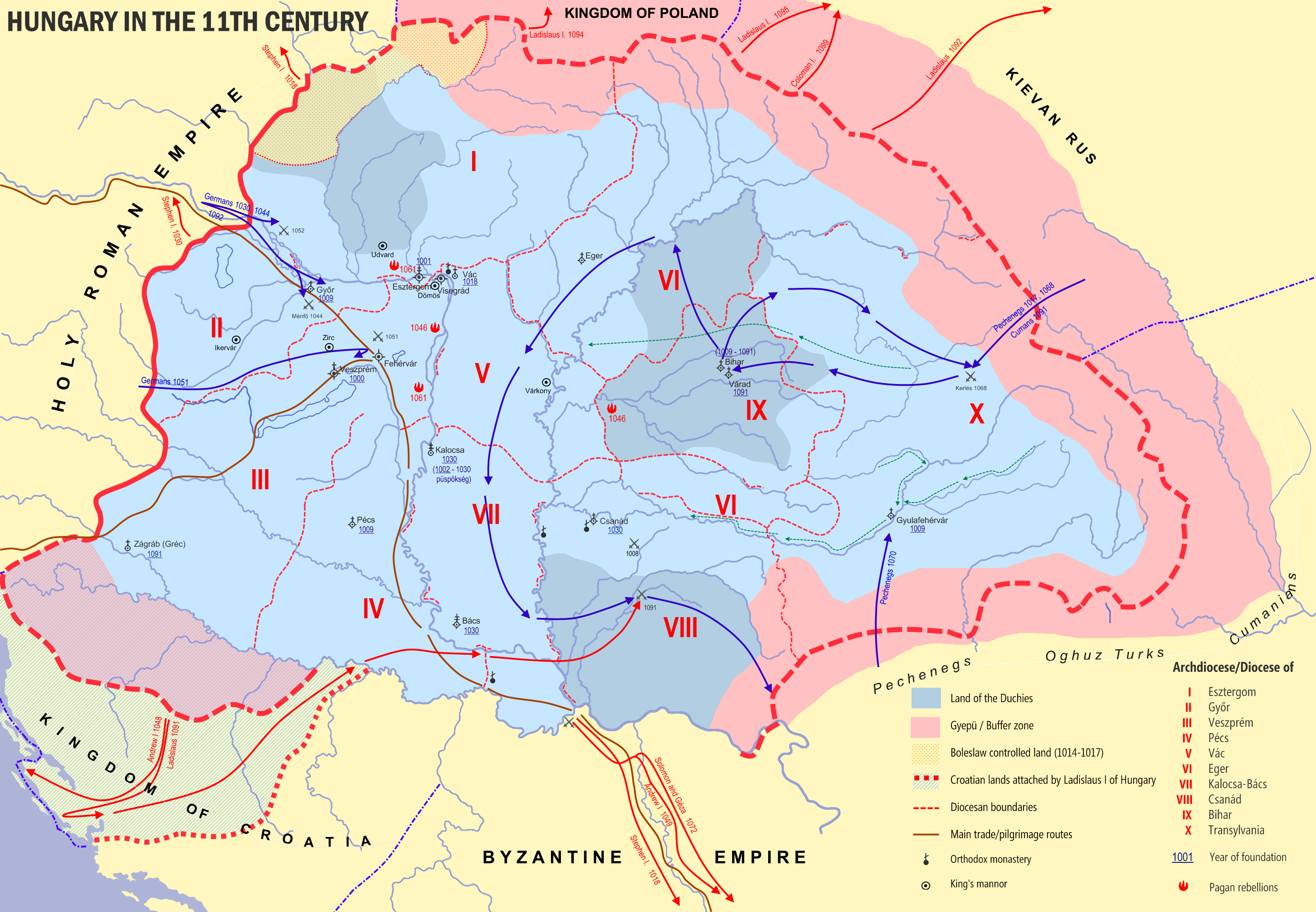
The Kingdom of Hungary at the end of the 11th century

Stephen I, the first crowned king of Hungary whose reign began in 1000 or 1001, unified the Carpathian Basin. Around 1003, he launched a campaign against "his maternal uncle, King Gyula" and occupied Transylvania. Stephen I later turned against Ahtum, "who had been baptised in the Orthodox faith in Vidin", and conquered Banat. Hartvik, Stephen I's hagiographer, wrote that the monarch "divided his territories in ten bishoprics". In the territory of modern Romania, three Roman Catholic dioceses were established with their seats in Alba Iulia, Biharea (from the last decades of the 11th century in Oradea), and Cenad.

Royal administration in the entire kingdom was based on counties organized around royal fortresses. In modern Romania's territory, references to an ispán or count of Alba in 1097, and to a count of Bihor in 1111 evidence the appearance of the county system. The counties in Banat and Crișana remained under direct royal authority, but a great officer of the realm, the voivode, supervised the ispáns of the Transylvanian counties from the end of the 12th century.

Eastward expansion of "Bijelo Brdo" villages along the Mureş continued in the 11th century. Cauldrons and huts with hearths carved into the soil were the characterizing items of the period. Nevertheless, semi-sunken huts with stone ovens from Sfântu Gheorghe, Șimonești and other villages evidence the survival of the local population. The lands between the Carpathians and the Tisa were plundered by Pechenegs in the 1010s and in 1068, by Ouzes in 1085, and by Cumans in 1091. Cluj, Dăbâca and other royal forts built of earth and timber were strengthened after the 1068 attack. In these forts appeared the so-called "Citfalău cemeteries", dependent upon late 11th-century royal legislation forcing commoners to set up their graveyards around churches.

The early presence of Székelys at Tileagd in Crișana, and at Gârbova, Saschiz, and Sebeș in Transylvania is attested by royal charters. Székely groups from Gârbova, Saschiz, and Sebeș were moved around 1150 into the easternmost regions of Transylvania, when the monarchs granted these territories to new settlers arriving from Western Europe. The Székelys were organized into "seats" instead of counties, and a royal officer, the "Count of the Székelys" became the head of their community from the 1220s. The Székelys provided military services to the monarchs and remained exempt of royal taxes.

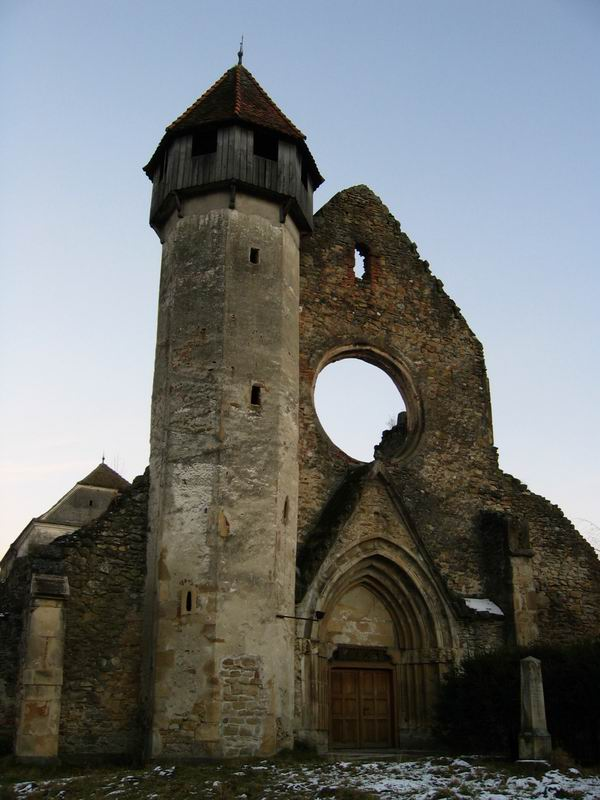
Ruins of the Cistercian Abbey at Cârța

A great number of Flemish, German, and Walloon "guest settlers" arrived in Transylvania around 1150. Wheel-made fine vessels with analogies in Thuringia found at Șelimbăr demonstrate the advanced technology they introduced to their new home. An account of royal revenues from the 1190s shows that almost one-tenth of all royal income derived from taxes they paid. In 1224, King Andrew II granted collective privileges to those inhabiting the region between Orăștie and Baraolt. The Diploma Andreanum confirmed the custom of freely electing their priests and local leaders; only the right to appoint the head of their community, the "Count of Sibiu", was preserved for the monarchs. The Transylvanian Saxons—as they were collectively mentioned from the early 13th century—also received the right to "use the forests of the Romanians and the Pechenegs" along with these peoples.

The earliest royal charter referring to Romanians in Transylvania is connected to the foundation of the Cistercian abbey at Cârța around 1202, which was granted land, up to that time possessed by Romanians. Another royal charter reveals that Romanians fought for Bulgaria along with Saxons, Székelys and Pechenegs under the leadership of the Count of Sibiu in 1210. The Orthodox Romanians remained exempt from the tithe payable by all Catholic peasants to the Church. Furthermore, they only paid a special in kind tax, the "fiftieth" on their herds.

Organized settling continued with the arrival of the Teutonic Knights in Ţara Bârsei in 1211. They were granted the right to freely pass through "the land of the Székelys and the land of the Vlachs" in 1222. The knights tried to free themselves from the monarch's authority, thus King Andrew II expelled them from the region in 1225. Thereafter, the king appointed his heir, Béla, with the title of duke, to administer Transylvania. Duke Béla occupied Oltenia and set up a new province, the Banate of Severin, in the 1230s.

=== Cumania: land of the Cumans (c. 1060–1241) ===
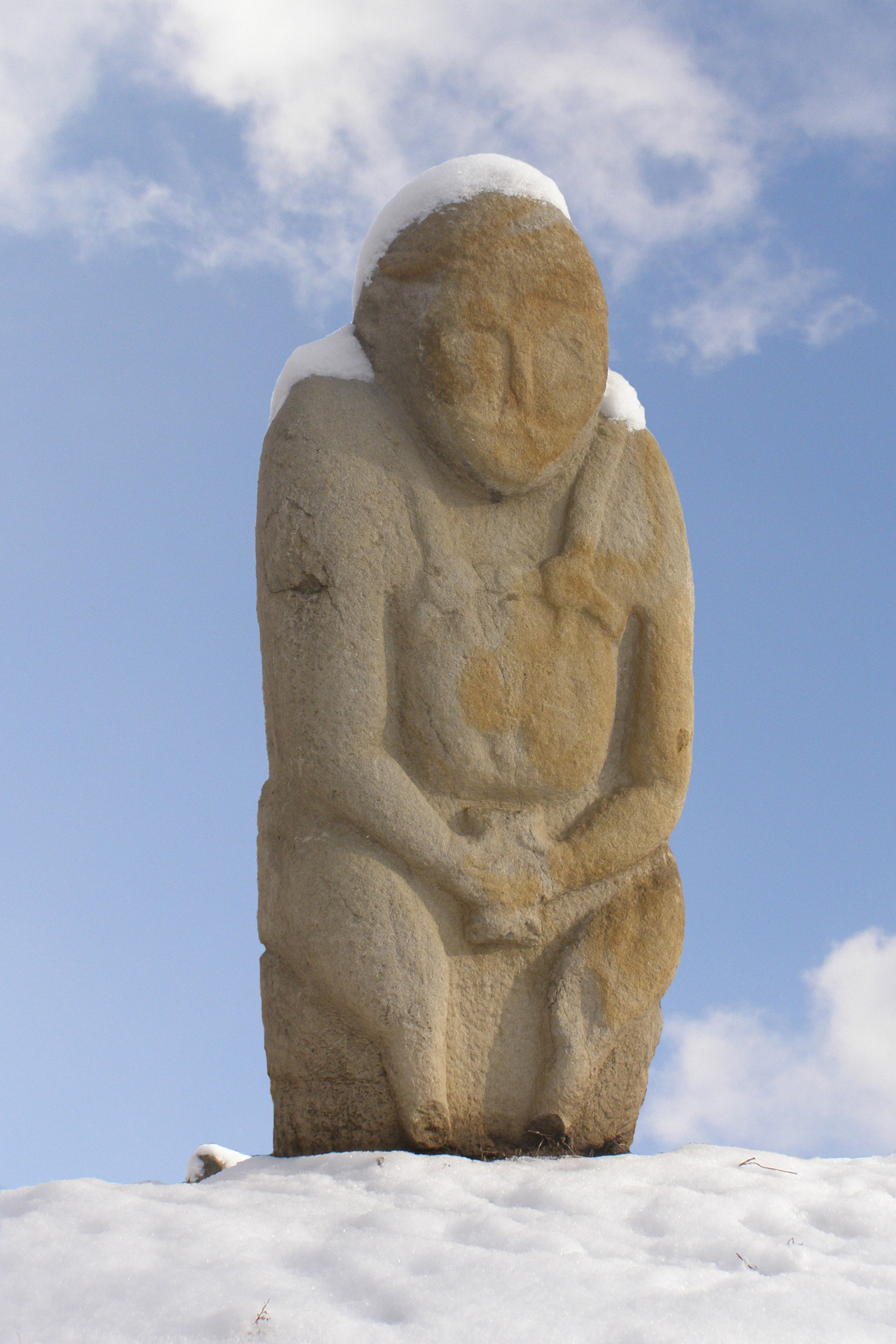
Cuman stone statue from the 11th century in Luhansk, Ukraine

The arrival of the Cumans in the Lower Danube region was first recorded in 1055. A 17th-century version of the Turkic chronicle Oghuzname relates that Qipchaq, the ancient Cuman hero, fought against the Ulak (Romanians), along with other nations. Cuman groups assisted the rebelling Bulgarians and Vlachs against the Byzantines between 1186 and 1197.

Dridu villages of the lowlands east of the Carpathians were abandoned between 1050 and 1080, around which time new settlements appeared on higher land on both banks of the Prut. A sharp decrease from 300 to 35 in the number of archaeological sites—settlements, cemeteries and coin hords—evidences a population decline which continued well into the 13th century. Byzantine troops marching towards Transylvania through the territory east of the Carpathians encountered "a land entirely bereft of men" in 1166.

A coalition of Rus' princes and Cuman tribes suffered a sound defeat by the Mongols in the Battle of the Kalka River in 1223. Shortly thereafter Boricius, a Cuman chieftain, accepted baptism and the supremacy of the king of Hungary. The Roman Catholic Diocese of Cumania was set up in his territories in 1228. A letter of 1234 written by Pope Gregory IX refers to a "certain people within the Cuman bishopric called Walati" (Vlachs) who even persuaded Catholic Hungarians and Germans to accept the ecclesiastic authority of Orthodox prelates.

=== Mongol invasion (1241–1242) ===
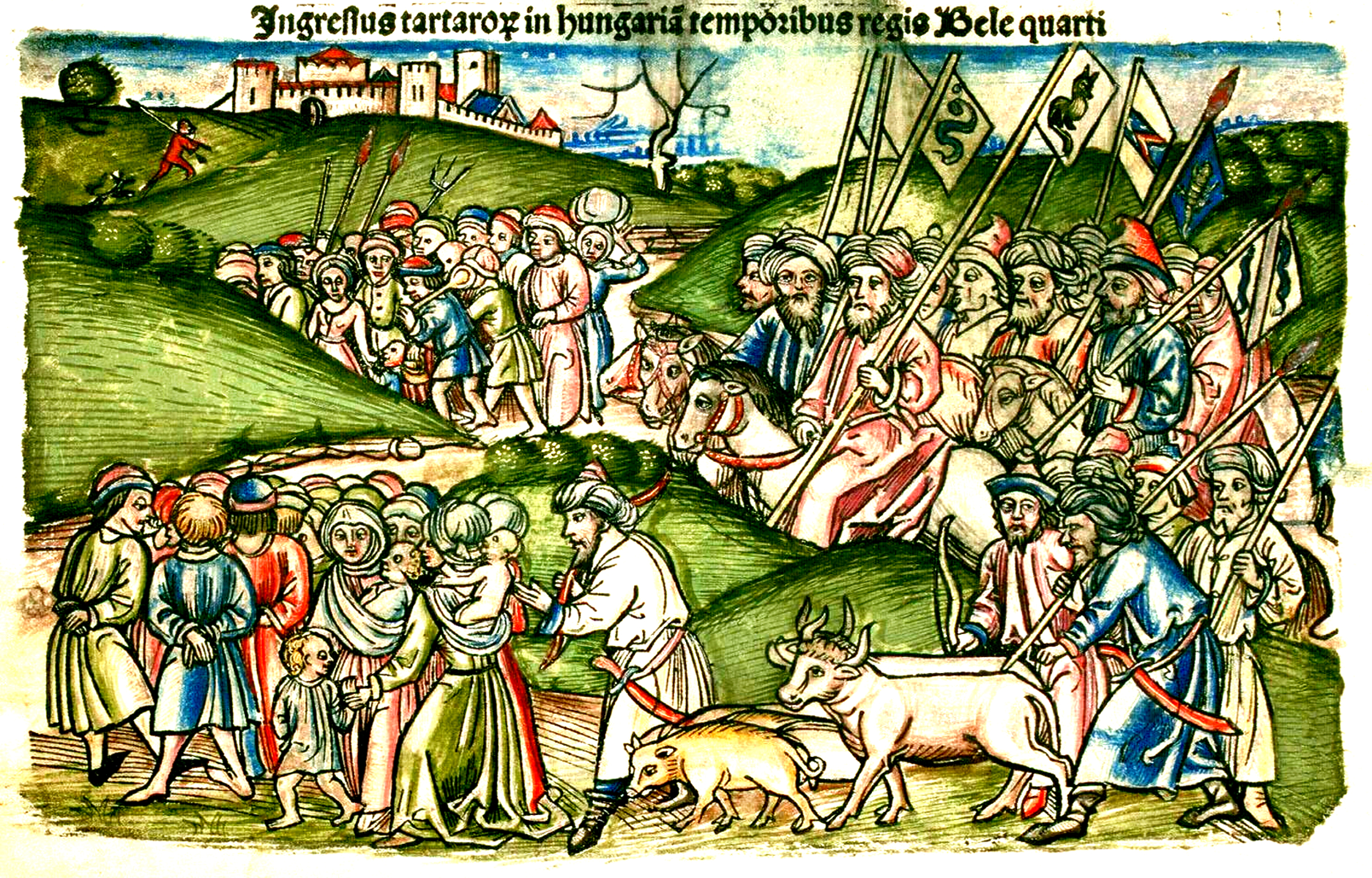
The Mongol invasion of the Kingdom of Hungary depicted in Chronica Hungarorum by Johannes de Thurocz

The Mongols, who had decided to invade Europe in 1235, attacked the Cumans in 1238. Masses of Cumans sought refuge in Bulgaria and Hungary. The Mongols crossed the Carpathians in March 1241, and soon afterwards they destroyed "the rich village of the Germans" (Rodna), and took Bistrița, Cluj, and Oradea. Another Mongol army "proceeded by way of the Qara-Ulagh" ("Black Vlachs"), and defeated their leader named "Mishlav". They also entered Transylvania, sacked Alba Iulia, Sibiu, the abbeys at Cârța and Igriș, and Cenad.

The Mongol invasion lasted for a year, and the Mongols devastated huge swathes of territory of the kingdom before their unexpected withdrawal in 1242. Matthew Paris and other contemporaneous scholars considered the Mongol invasion as a "sign of apocalypse". Whole villages were destroyed, and many were never rebuilt. According to a royal charter of 1246, Alba Iulia, Harina, Gilău, Mărișelu, Tășnad and Zalău were almost depopulated. Another charter from 1252 evidences that Zec, a village on the Olt, was totally deserted.

After the devastation of the region, they [the Mongols] surrounded the great village with a combined force of some Tatars together with Russians, Cumans and their Hungarian prisoners. They sent first the Hungarian prisoners ahead and when they were all slain, the Russians, the Ishmaelites, and Cumans went into battle. The Tatars, standing behind them all at the back, laughed at their plight and ruin and killed those who retreated from the battle and subjected as many as they could to their devouring swords, so that after fighting for a week, day and night, and filling up the moat, they captured the village. Then they made the soldiers and ladies, of whom there were many, stand in a field on one side and the peasants on the other. Having robbed them of their money, clothing and other goods, they cruelly executed them with axes and swords, leaving only some of the ladies and girls alive, whom they took for their entertainment.

— Master Roger's Epistle

== Aftermath ==
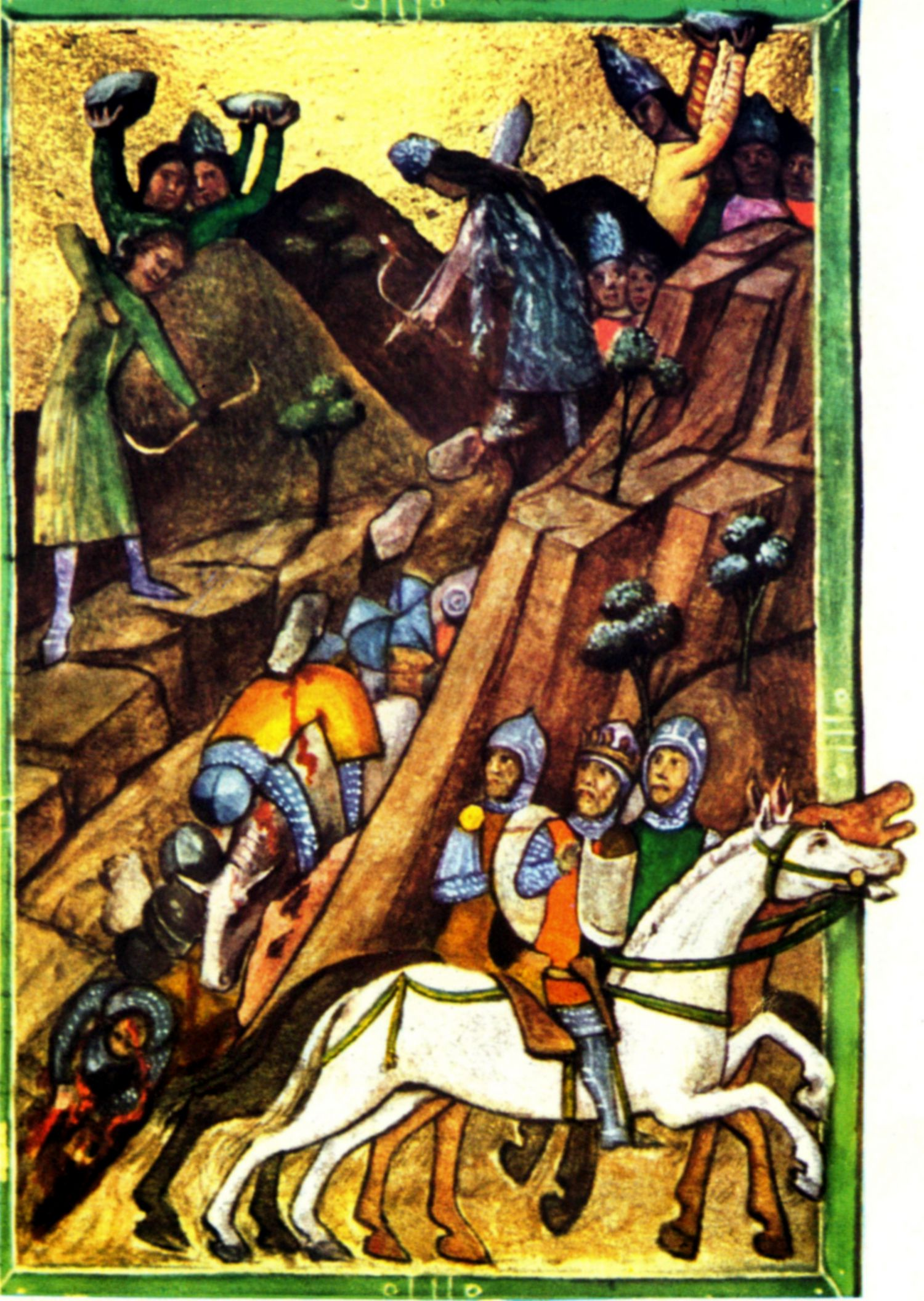
The army of Charles Robert Anjou ambushed by Basarab's army at 1330 Posada (from the Illuminated Chronicle manuscript)

A new period of intensive settlements began in Banat, Transylvania and other regions within the Kingdom of Hungary after the withdrawal of the Mongols. King Béla IV was also considering settling the Knights Hospitallers in the lands between the Carpathians and the Lower Danube. His diploma of 1247 for the Knights evidences the existence of four Romanian polities in the region. They were under the rule of voivodes Litovoi and Seneslau, and of knezes Farcaș and John.

Internal conflicts characterized the last decades of the 13th century in the Kingdom of Hungary. For instance, a feud between King Béla and his son, Stephen caused a civil war which lasted from 1261 to 1266. Taking advantage of the emerging anarchy, Voivode Litovoi attempted to get rid of the Hungarian monarchs' suzerainty in the 1270s, but he fell in a battle while fighting against royal troops. One of his successors, Basarab I of Wallachia was the first Romanian monarch whose sovereignty was internationally recognized after his victory over King Charles I of Hungary in the Battle of Posada of 1330.

== See also ==
- Balkan–Danubian culture – Archaeological culture from Europe
- Banat in the Middle Ages
- Bulgarian lands across the Danube
- History of the Székely people

== Sources ==
=== Primary sources ===
- Ammianus Marcellinus: The Later Roman Empire (AD 354–378) (Selected and translated by Walter Hamilton, With an Introduction and Notes by Andrew Wallace-Hadrill) (2004). Penguin Books. ISBN 978-0-14-044406-3.
- Anna Comnena: The Alexiad (Translated by E. R. A. Sewter) (1969). Penguin Books. ISBN 978-0-14-044958-7.
- Anonymus, Notary of King Béla: The Deeds of the Hungarians (Edited, Translated and Annotated by Martyn Rady and László Veszprémy) (2010). In: Rady, Martyn; Veszprémy, László; Bak, János M. (2010); Anonymus and Master Roger; CEU Press; ISBN 978-963-9776-95-1.
- Constantine Porphyrogenitus: De Administrando Imperio (Greek text edited by Gyula Moravcsik, English translation b Romillyi J. H. Jenkins) (1967). Dumbarton Oaks Center for Byzantine Studies. ISBN 0-88402-021-5.
- Deeds of John and Manuel Comnenus by John Kinnamos (Translated by Charles M. Brand) (1976). Columbia University Press. ISBN 0-231-04080-6.
- Eymund's Saga (1989). In Vikings in Russia: Yngvar's Saga and Eymund's Saga (Translated and Introduced by Hermann Palsson and Paul Edwards). Edingburgh University Press. pp. 69–89. ISBN 0-85224-623-4.
- Eutropius: Breviarium (Translated with an introduction and commentary by H. W. Bird) (1993). Liverpool University Press. ISBN 0-85323-208-3.
- Genethliacus of Maximian Augustus by an Anonymous Orator (291) (Translation and Notes by Rodgers) (1994). In: In Praise of Later Roman Emperors: The Panegyrici Latini (Introduction, Translation, and Historical Commentary with the Latin Text of R. A. B. Mynors by C. E. V. Nixon and Barbara Saylor Rodgers) (1994); University of California Press; ISBN 0-520-08326-1.
- Hartvic, Life of King Stephen of Hungary (Translated by Nora Berend) (2001). In: Head, Thomas (2001); Medieval Hagiography: An Anthology; Routledge; ISBN 0-415-93753-1.
- Master Roger's Epistle to the Sorrowful Lament upon the Destruction of the Kingdom of Hungary by the Tatars (Translated and Annotated by János M. Bak and Martyn Rady) (2010). In: Rady, Martyn; Veszprémy, László; Bak, János M. (2010); Anonymus and Master Roger; CEU Press; ISBN 978-963-9776-95-1.
- Maurice's Strategikon: Handbook of Byzantine Military Strategy (Translated by George T. Dennis) (1984). University of Pennsylvania Press. ISBN 0-8122-1772-1.
- Philostorgius: Church History (Translated with an Introduction and Notes by Philip R. Amidon, S. J.) (2007). Society of Biblical Literature. ISBN 978-1-58983-215-2.
- Procopius: History of the Wars (Books VI.16–VII.35.) (With an English Translation by H. B. Dewing) (2006). Harvard University Press. ISBN 0-674-99191-5.
- Royal Frankish Annals (1972). In: Carolingian Chronicles: Royal Frankish Annals and Nithard's Histories (Translated by Bernhard Walter Scholz with Barbara Rogers); The University of Michigan Press; ISBN 0-472-06186-0.
- The Annals of Fulda (Ninth-Century Histories, Volume II) (Translated and annotated by Timothy Reuter) (1992). Manchester University Press. ISBN 0-7190-3458-2.
- The Chronicle of Theophanes Confessor: Byzantine and Near Eastern History, AD 284–813 (Translated with Introduction and Commentary by Cyril Mango and Roger Scott with the assistance of Geoffrey Greatrex) (2006). Oxford University Press. ISBN 978-0-19-822568-3.
- The Geography of Ananias of Širak (AŠXARHAC’OYC’): The Long and the Short Recensions (Introduction, Translation and Commentary by Robert H. Hewsen) (1992). Dr. Ludwig Reichert Verlag. ISBN 3-88226-485-3.
- The Gothic History of Jordanes (in English Version with an Introduction and a Commentary by Charles Christopher Mierow, Ph.D., Instructor in Classics in Princeton University) (2006). Evolution Publishing. ISBN 1-889758-77-9.
- The History of Theophylact Simocatta (An English Translation with Introduction and Notes: Michael and Mary Whitby) (1986). Clarendon Press. ISBN 0-19-822799-X.
- The Hungarian Illuminated Chronicle: Chronica de Gestis Hungarorum (Edited by Dezső Dercsényi) (1970). Corvina, Taplinger Publishing. ISBN 0-8008-4015-1.
- The Successors of Genghis Khan (Translated from the Persian of Rashīd Al-Dīn by John Andrew Boyle) (1971). Columbia University Press. ISBN 0-231-03351-6.

=== Secondary sources ===
- Barford, P. M. (2001). The Early Slavs: Culture and Society in Early Medieval Eastern Europe. Cornell University Press. ISBN 0-8014-3977-9.
- Bărbulescu, Mihai (2005). "From the Romans until the End of the First Millenium AD". In Pop, Ioan-Aurel; Nägler, Thomas (eds.). The History of Transylvania, Vol. I. (until 1541). Romanian Cultural Institute. pp. 137–198. ISBN 973-7784-04-9.
- Bolovan, Ioan; Constantiniu, Florin; Michelson, Paul E.; Pop, Ioan Aurel; Popa, Cristian; Popa, Marcel; Scurtu, Ioan; Treptow, Kurt W.; Vultur, Marcela; Watts, Larry L. (1997). A History of Romania. The Center for Romanian Studies. ISBN 973-98091-0-3.
- Bóna, István (1994). "From Dacia to Transylvania: The Period of the Great Migrations (271–895); The Hungarian–Slav Period (895–1172)". In Köpeczi, Béla; Barta, Gábor; Bóna, István; Makkai, László; Szász, Zoltán; Borus, Judit (eds.). History of Transylvania. Akadémiai Kiadó. pp. 62–177. ISBN 963-05-6703-2.
- Curta, Florin (2001). The Making of the Slavs: History and Archaeology of the Lower Danube Region, c. 500–700. Cambridge: Cambridge University Press.
- Curta, Florin (2005). "Frontier Ethnogenesis in Late Antiquity: The Danube, the Tervingi, and the Slavs". In Curta, Florin (ed.). Borders, Barriers, and Ethnogenesis: Frontiers in Late Antiquity and the Middle Ages. Brepols. pp. 173–204. ISBN 2-503-51529-0.
- Curta, Florin (2006). Southeastern Europe in the Middle Ages, 500–1250. Cambridge: Cambridge University Press.
- Curta, Florin (2008). "Before Cyril and Methodius: Christianity and Barbarians beyond the Sixth- and Seventh-Century Danube Frontier". In Curta, Florin (ed.). East Central & Eastern Europe in the Early Middle Ages. The University of Michigan Press. pp. 181–219. ISBN 978-0-472-11498-6.
- Ellis, L. (1998). "Terra deserta: population, politics, and the [de]colonization of Dacia". In Shennan, Stephen (ed.). Population and Demography (World Archaeology, Volume Thirty, Number Two). Routledge. pp. 220–237. ISSN 0043-8243.
- Engel, Pál (2001). The Realm of St Stephen: A History of Medieval Hungary, 895–1526. I.B. Tauris Publishers. ISBN 1-86064-061-3.
- Fiedler, Uwe (2008). "Bulgars in the Lower Danube region: A survey of the archaeological evidence and of the state of current research". In Curta, Florin; Kovalev, Roman (eds.). The Other Europe in the Middle Ages: Avars, Bulgars, Khazars, and Cumans. Brill. pp. 151–236. ISBN 978-90-04-16389-8.
- Fine, John V. A (1991). The Early Medieval Balkans: A Critical Survey from the Sixth to the Late Twelfth century. The University of Michigan Press. ISBN 0-472-08149-7.
- Georgescu, Vlad (1991). The Romanians: A History. Ohio State University Press. ISBN 0-8142-0511-9.
- Hall, Robert A. Jr. (1974). External History of the Romance Languages. American Elsevier Publishing Company. ISBN 0-444-00136-0.
- Haynes, I. P.; Hanson, W. S. (2004). "An introduction to Roman Dacia". In Haynes, I. P.; Hanson, W. S. (eds.). Roman Dacia: The Making of a Provincial Society (Journal of Roman Archaeology Supplementary Series, Number 56). Journal of Roman Archaeology, L.L.C. pp. 11–31. ISBN 1-887829-56-3.
- Heather, Peter; Matthews, John (1991). The Goths in the Fourth Century (Translated Texts for Historians, Volume 11). Liverpool University Press. ISBN 978-0-85323-426-5.
- Heather, Peter (2006). The Fall of the Roman Empire: A New History of Rome and the Barbarians. Oxford University Press. ISBN 978-0-19-515954-7.
- Heather, Peter (2010). Empires and Barbarians: The Fall of Rome and the Birth of Europe. Oxford University Press. ISBN 978-0-19-973560-0.
- Jesch, Judith (2001). Ships and Men in the Late Viking Age: The Vocabulary of Runic Inscriptions and Skaldic Verse. Boydell & Brewer. ISBN 978-0-85115-826-6.
- Kristó, Gyula (2003). Early Transylvania (895-1324). Lucidus Kiadó. ISBN 963-9465-12-7.
- Macartney, C. A. (1953). The Medieval Hungarian Historians: A Critical & Analytical Guide. Cambridge University Press. ISBN 978-0-521-08051-4.
- MacKendrick, Paul (1975). The Dacian Stones Speak. The University of North Carolina Press. ISBN 0-8078-1226-9.
- Madgearu, Alexandru (2005a). "Salt Trade and Warfare: The Rise of Romanian-Slavic Military Organization in Early Medieval Transylvania". In Curta, Florin (ed.). East Central & Eastern Europe in the Early Middle Ages. The University of Michigan Press. pp. 103–120. ISBN 978-0-472-11498-6.
- Madgearu, Alexandru (2005b). The Romanians in the Anonymous Gesta Hungarorum: Truth and Fiction. Romanian Cultural Institute, Center for Transylvanian Studies. ISBN 973-7784-01-4.
- Maenchen-Helfen, Otto J. (1973). The World of the Huns: Studies in Their History and Culture (Edited by Max Knight). University of California Press. ISBN 0-520-01596-7.
- Makkai, László (1994). "The Emergence of the Estates (1172–1526)". In Köpeczi, Béla; Barta, Gábor; Bóna, István; Makkai, László; Szász, Zoltán; Borus, Judit (eds.). History of Transylvania. Akadémiai Kiadó. pp. 178–243. ISBN 963-05-6703-2.
- Mallinson, Graham (1998). "Rumanian". In Harris, Martin; Vincent, Nigel (eds.). The Romance Languages. Oxford University Press. pp. 391–419. ISBN 0-19-520829-3.
- Nandris, Grigore (December 1951). "The Development and Structure of Rumanian". The Slavonic and East European Review. 30 (74). London: Modern Humanities Research Association & University College of London (School of Slavonic and East European Studies): 7–39.
- Opreanu, Coriolan Horaţiu (2005). "The North-Danube Regions from the Roman Province of Dacia to the Emergence of the Romanian Language (2nd–8th Centuries AD)". In Pop, Ioan-Aurel; Bolovan, Ioan (eds.). History of Romania: Compendium. Romanian Cultural Institute (Center for Transylvanian Studies). pp. 59–132. ISBN 978-973-7784-12-4.
- Orel, Vladimir (1998). Albanian Etymological Dictionary. BRILL. ISBN 90-04-11024-0.
- Petrucci, Peter R. (1999). Slavic Features in the History of Rumanian. LINCOM EUROPA. ISBN 3-89586-599-0.
- Sălăgean, Tudor (2005). "Romanian Society in the Early Middle Ages (9th–14th Centuries AD)". In Pop, Ioan-Aurel; Bolovan, Ioan (eds.). History of Romania: Compendium. Romanian Cultural Institute (Center for Transylvanian Studies). pp. 133–207. ISBN 978-973-7784-12-4.
- Spinei, Victor (2003). The Great Migrations in the East and South East of Europe from the Ninth to the Thirteenth Century. Romanian Cultural Institute (Center for Transylvanian Studies) and Museum of Brăila Istros Publishing House. ISBN 973-85894-5-2.
- Spinei, Victor (2009). The Romanians and the Turkic Nomads North of the Danube Delta from the Tenth to the Mid-Thirteenth century. Koninklijke Brill NV. ISBN 978-90-04-17536-5.
- Stephenson, Paul (2000). Byzantium's Balkan Frontier: A Political Study of the Northern Balkans, 900–1204. Cambridge University Press. ISBN 978-0-521-02756-4.
- Teodor, Dan Gh. (1980). The East Carpathian Area of Romania in the V-XI Centuries A.D. (BAR International Series 81). B. A. R. ISBN 0-86054-090-1.
- Teodor, Eugen S. (2005). "The Shadow of a Frontier: The Wallachian Plain during the Justinian Age". In Curta, Florin (ed.). Borders, Barriers, and Ethnogenesis: Frontiers in Late Antiquity and the Middle Ages. Brepols. pp. 205–245. ISBN 2-503-51529-0.
- Thompson, E. A. (2001). The Huns. Blackwell Publishers. ISBN 0-631-15899-5.
- Todd, Malcolm (2003). The Early Germans. Blackwell Publishing Ltd. ISBN 0-631-16397-2.
- Tóth, Endre (1994). "The Roman Province of Dacia". In Köpeczi, Béla; Barta, Gábor; Bóna, István; Makkai, László; Szász, Zoltán; Borus, Judit (eds.). History of Transylvania. Akadémiai Kiadó. pp. 28–61. ISBN 963-05-6703-2.
- Treadgold, Warren (1997). A History of the Byzantine State and Society. Stanford University Press. ISBN 0-8047-2630-2.
- Treptow, Kurt W.; Popa, Marcel (1996). Historical Dictionary of Romania. Scarecrow Press, Inc. ISBN 0-8108-3179-1.
- Urbańczyk, Przemysław (2005). "Early State Formation in East Central Europe". In Curta, Florin (ed.). East Central & Eastern Europe in the Early Middle Ages. The University of Michigan Press. pp. 139–151. ISBN 978-0-472-11498-6.
- Vásáry, István (2005). Cumans and Tatars: Oriental Military in the Pre-Ottoman Balkans, 1185–1365. Cambridge University Press. ISBN 0-521-83756-1.
- Vékony, Gábor (2000). Dacians, Romans, Romanians. Matthias Corvinus Publishing. ISBN 1-882785-13-4.
- Wolfram, Herwig (1988). History of the Goths. University of California Press. ISBN 0-520-06983-8.
- Wolfram, Herwig (1997). The Roman Empire and Its Germanic Peoples. ISBN 0-520-08511-6.
