= Blakumen =

Medieval people

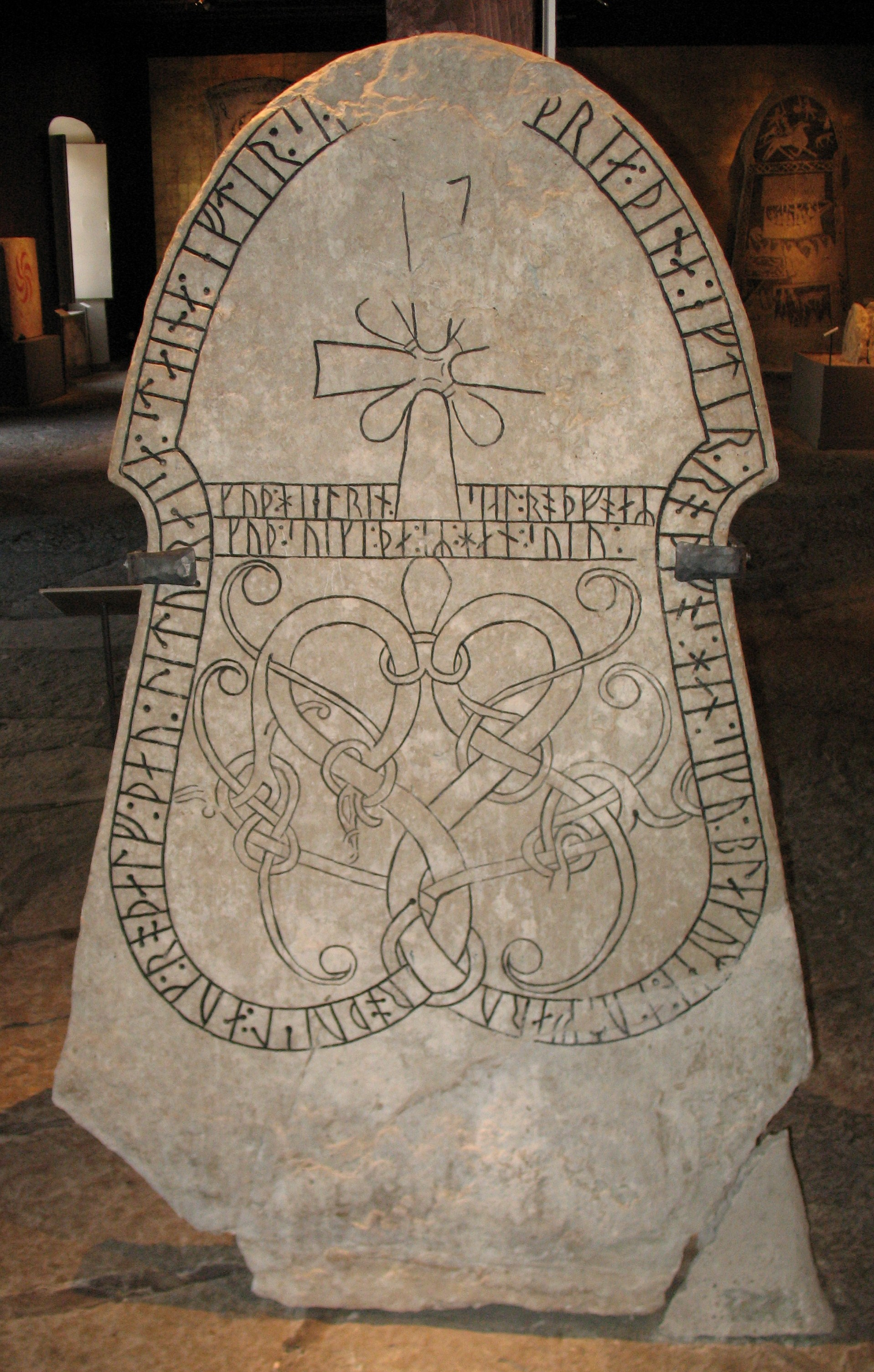
The 11th-century runestone G134 referring to Blakumen (Sjonhem cemetery, Gotland, Sweden)

Blakumen or Blökumenn were a people mentioned in Scandinavian sources dating from the 11th through 13th centuries. The name of their land, Blokumannaland, has also been preserved. Victor Spinei, Florin Curta, Florin Pintescu and other historians identify them as Romanians (variation of the exonym Vlach), while Omeljan Pritsak argues that they were Cumans. Judith Jesch adds the possibility that the terms meant "black men", the meaning of which is unclear. Historians identify Blokumannaland as the lands south of the Lower Danube which were inhabited by Vlachs in the Middle Ages, adding that the term may refer to either Wallachia (to the north of the Danube) or Africa in the modern Icelandic language.

== Blakumen on runestone G134 ==
The only preserved example of the variant Blakumen of the ethnonym was an inscription on a runestone in the Sjonhem cemetery in Gotland in Sweden. The forms of the runes on the memorial stone suggest that it was raised in approximately 1050 AD. According to its inscription, a Varangian couple named Hróðvísl and Hróðelfr set up the stone in memory of one of their sons, Hróðfúss, who had been treacherously killed by Blakumen while traveling abroad. Although the inscription does not contain more information about the crime, Spinei expands on the inscription, arguing that Hróðfúss was murdered by Vlachs in the regions east of the Carpathian Mountains. Curta proposes that Hróðfúss was a merchant traveling towards Constantinople, who was attacked and killed by Vlachs north of the Lower Danube. Jesch likewise suggests that Hróðfúss was a merchant "on a voyage abroad", and assumes that he was murdered by local merchants who betrayed his trust. Jesch translates Blakumen as Vlachs, confronting their treachery with their untrustworthiness as claimed by Kekaumenos. Jesch also allows for the possibility that the term may have meant "black men", in which case the meaning is unclear. Pritsak refuses to identify the Blakumen in the inscription with Vlachs, instead stating that they were Cumans, whose migration towards the westernmost regions of the Pontic steppes began around the time when the memorial stone was erected. Spinei counters this view because several mentions of the Blakumen or Blökumen (for instance in the Eymund's Saga) occur in contexts taking place decades before the earliest appearance of the Cumans in the Pontic steppe. Spinei also says that if understood as meaning "Black Cumans", then the term is not concordant with the Varangian ethnic terminology (derived from either Germanic or East-Slavic naming traditions), that it is not attested in mirror forms in other languages (such as *cumani nigri in Latin or *mauro Koumanoi in Greek), and that the juxtaposition of a Scandinavian adjective and a proper name of Greek or Latin origin (at the expense of the German Walven designating Cumans) to produce Blakumen ("black Cumans") and Blokumannaland ("the land of the black Cumans") is highly improbable.

Hróðvísl and Hróðelfr, they had stones set up in memory of [their] three sons. This one in memory of Hróðfúss. Blakumen betrayed him on an expedition. God help Hróðfúss' soul. God betray those who betrayed him.

— Runestone G134

== Blökumenn in the Flatey Book ==
Blökumen are mentioned in the Flateyjarbók, an Icelandic manuscript from the late 14th century, which preserved a 13th-century biography of King Olaf of Norway. This work contains a separate chapter on the adventures of a Norwegian prince, Eymund, at the court of Prince Jarizleifr in Novgorod. The chapter narrates that Eymund informed Jarizleifr of the departure of Jarizleifr's brother, Burizlaf, to Tyrkland, and added that Burizlaf was preparing to attack Jarizleifr with a huge army formed by Tyrkir, Blökumen and other peoples. Curta, Spinei and other scholars identify Jarizleifr with Yaroslav the Wise, and Burizlaf with Sviatopolk I of Kiev. They argue that the reference to the Tyrkir and Blökumen proves that Sviatopolk I hired Pechenegs and Vlachs when he decided to go to war with Yaroslav. Furthermore, they propose that the Blökumenn of the Flatey Book, like the Blakumen of the runic inscription from Gottland, were Vlachs from Moldavia or Wallachia.

"It was easier for [Burizlaf] to lose his banner than his life," said Eymund, "and I understood that he escaped and has been in Tyrkland over the winter. Now he means to lead another army against [Jarizleifr]. He's gathered an unbeatable army with Tyrkir, Blökumen, and a good many of other nasty people, and I've also heard that he's quite likely to give up his Christian faith and hand over both kingdoms to these unpleasant people should he manage to take Russia away from you [Jarizleifr]".

— Eymund's Saga

== Blokumannaland ==
Blokumannaland is a territory mentioned in Snorri Sturluson's Heimskringla ("The Circle of the World") from the 13th century. The book narrates how the Byzantine Emperor Alexios I Komnenos, referred to by the name Kirjalax, invaded Blokumannaland where he fought against pagan tribes. Since these pagans have not been identified, there is disagreement as to the actual date of the Byzantine invasion. For instance, Spinei identifies the events prescribed in the Heimskringla with the Battle of Levounion of 1091 AD, which ended with the catastrophic defeat of the Pechenegs by the Byzantines. He argues that Blokumannaland refers to a territory inhabited by Vlachs south of the Lower Danube. On the other hand, Sandaaker proposes that the battle took place in 1040 AD, while the latest date of 1122 AD was proposed by Ellis Davidson and Blöndal. Alexandru Madgearu says that Sturluson anachronistically mentioned the lands south of the Danube as Blokummanaland, because the latter term referred to the Second Bulgarian Empire in Sturluson's time. In the modern Icelandic language, the term Blokumannaland may refer to either Wallachia or Africa.

The following happened in Greece, the time when King Kirjalax ruled there and was on an expedition against Blokumannaland. When he arrived at the Pézína Plains, a heathen king advanced against him with an irresistible host. They had with them a company of horsemen, and huge waggons with embrasures on top.

— Snorri Sturluson's Heimskringla

== See also ==
- Bolokhovians
- Origin of the Romanians
- Romania in the Early Middle Ages

== Sources ==
=== Primary sources ===
- Snorri Sturluson: Heimskringla: History of the Kings of Norway (Translated by Lee M. Hollander) (2009). The American-Scandinavian Foundation. ISBN 978-0-292-73061-8.
- Eymund's Saga (1989). In Vikings in Russia: Yngvar's Saga and Eymund's Saga (Translated and Introduced by Hermann Palsson and Paul Edwards). Edingburgh University Press. pp. 69–89. ISBN 0-85224-623-4.

=== Secondary sources ===
- Curta, Florin (2006). Southeastern Europe in the Middle Ages, 500-1250. Cambridge University Press. ISBN 978-0-521-89452-4.
- Jesch, Judith (2001). Ships and Men in the Late Viking Age: The Vocabulary of Runic Inscriptions and Skaldic Verse. Boydell & Brewer. ISBN 978-0-85115-826-6.
- Pintescu, Florin (2001). "Presences de l'element viking dans l'espace de la romanité orientale en contexte méditerranéen [The Vikings' presence in Eastern Romance lands in a Mediterranean context]". Studia Antiqua et Archaeologica. VIII. Centrul Interdisciplinar de Studii Arheoistorice: 257–272. ISSN 1224-2284.
- Madgearu, Alexandru (2013). Byzantine Military Organization on the Danube, 10th–12th Centuries. Brill. ISBN 978-90-04-21243-5.
- Pritsak, Omeljan (1981). The Origin of Rus': Old Scandinavian Sources Other than the Sagas. Harvard University Press. ISBN 0-674-64465-4.
- Spinei, Victor (2009). The Romanians and the Turkic Nomads North of the Danube Delta from the Tenth to the Mid-Thirteenth century. Koninklijke Brill NV. ISBN 978-90-04-17536-5.
- Yotov, Valeri (2007). "The Vikings in the Balkans (tenth to 11th centuries). Strategic and tactical changes. New archaeological data". Archaeologia Baltica. 8: 321–327. ISSN 1392-5520.
