= Crasna =

Crasna may refer to:

Populated places:

- Crasna, Gorj, a commune in Gorj County, Romania
- Crasna, Sălaj, a commune in Sălaj County, Romania
- Crasna, a village in Sita Buzăului Commune, Covasna County, Romania
- Crasna, a village in Albeşti Commune, Vaslui County, Romania
- Crasna Vișeului, a village in Bistra Commune, Maramureș County, Romania
- Crasna, the Romanian name for Krasne, Tarutyne Raion, Ukraine

Rivers:

- Crasna (Tisza), a river in northwestern Romania and northeastern Hungary
- Crasna (Bârlad), a tributary of the Bârlad in Iași and Vaslui Counties
- Crasna (Buzău), a tributary of the Buzău in Covasna and Buzău Counties
- Crasna (Teleajen), a tributary of the Teleajen in Prahova County
- Crasna Veche, a river in northwestern Romania and northeastern Hungary

== See also ==
- Kraszna County, an administrative division of the Kingdom of Hungary
- Krasnoilsk or Crasna in Romanian, a town in Chernivtsi Oblast, Ukraine
