= Dersca =

- Commune
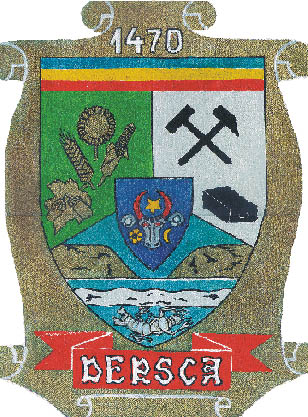
- Coat of arms

- Location in Botoșani County

- Location in Romania
- Coordinates: 47°59′N 26°12′E
- Country: Romania
- County: Botoșani

Government
  - Mayor (2024–2028): Mihai Cazacu (PSD)
- Area: 38.58 km^{2} (14.90 sq mi)
- Population (2021-12-01): 3,240
  - Density: 84.0/km^{2} (218/sq mi)
- Time zone: UTC+02:00 (EET)
  - Summer (DST): UTC+03:00 (EEST)
- Postal code: 717125
- Area code: +40 x31
- Vehicle reg.: BT
- Website: comunadersca.ro

Dersca is a commune in Botoșani County, Western Moldavia, Romania. It is composed of a single village, Dersca. It also included Lozna and Străteni villages until 2003, when they were split off to form Lozna Commune.
