= Crasna Veche =

- Location within Romania Location within Hungary

Location
- Countries: Romania and Hungary
- Counties: Satu Mare and Szabolcs-Szatmar-Bereg

Physical characteristics
- Source
  - location: Domănești, Romania
  - coordinates: 47.712°N 22.588°E
- Mouth: Crasna
  - location: Hungary

The Crasna Veche is a tributary of the River Crasna. It is the old lower reach of the Crasna before its channelization and is used at present mainly as a drainage canal. It originates in Romania near the village of Domănești, crosses into Hungary north of Berveni and finally joins the new course of the Crasna near Nagyecsed.
