= Lozna, Botoșani =

Lozna
- Commune
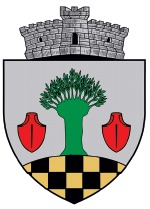
- Coat of arms

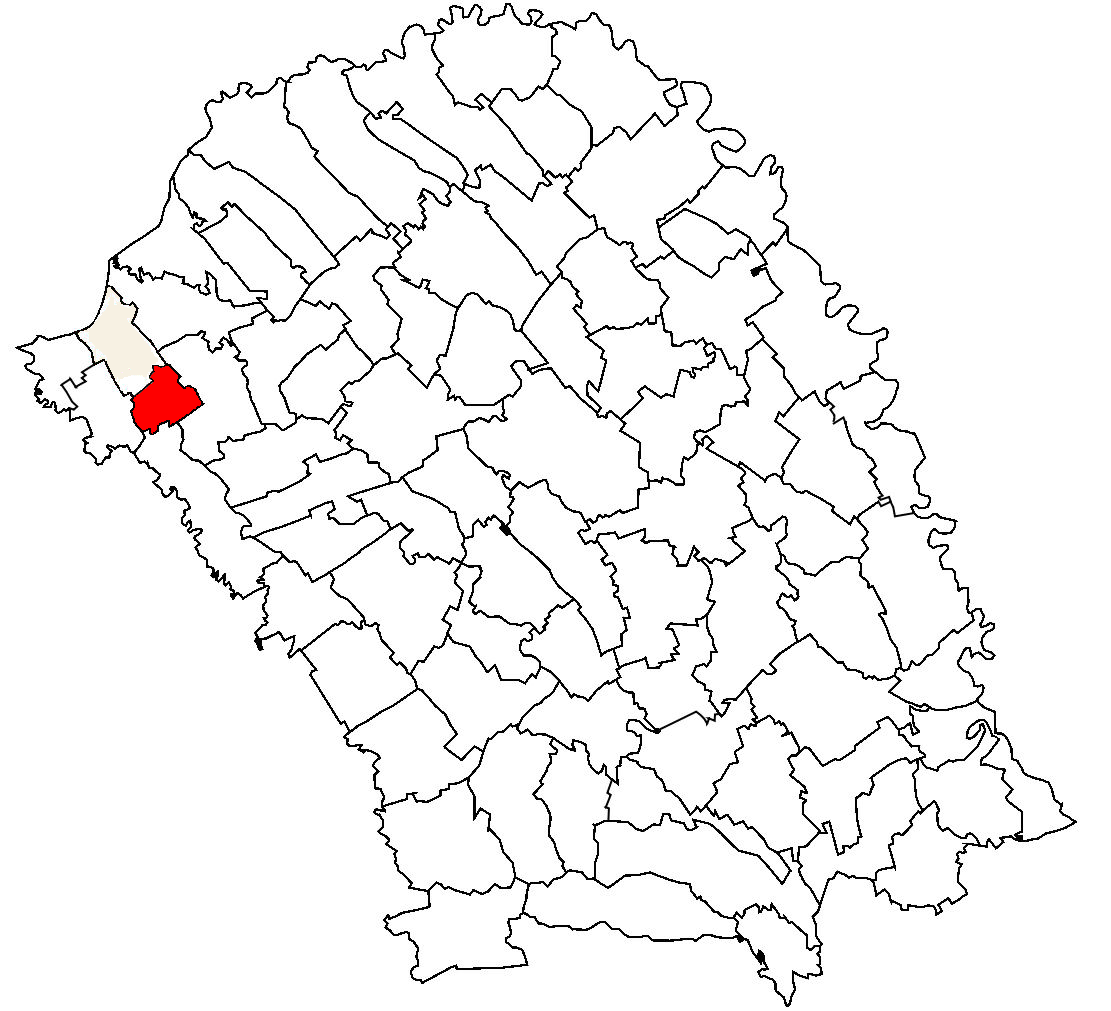
- Location in Botoșani County

- Location in Romania
- Coordinates: 47°57′N 26°17′E
- Country: Romania
- County: Botoșani
- Subdivisions: Lozna, Străteni

Government
  - Mayor (2024–2028): Viorel Lozneanu (PSD)
- Area: 23.65 km^{2} (9.13 sq mi)
- Population (2021-12-01): 1,862
  - Density: 78.73/km^{2} (203.9/sq mi)
- Time zone: UTC+02:00 (EET)
  - Summer (DST): UTC+03:00 (EEST)
- Postal code: 717126
- Area code: +40 x31
- Vehicle reg.: BT

Lozna is a commune in Botoșani County, Western Moldavia, Romania. It is composed of two villages, Lozna and Străteni. Until 2003, these belonged to Dersca Commune, when they were split off.
