= Drobeta (disambiguation) =

Drobeta is a genus of moths of the family Noctuidae, named after ancient Drobeta.

Drobeta (Romanian pronunciation: [droˈbeta]) can also refer to:

- Drobeta-Turnu Severin, a city in Romania; had Dacian and Roman precursors both named Drobeta
  - Drobeta (castra), Roman fortified place at the site
- Coat of arms of Drobeta-Turnu Severin
- FC Drobeta, a Romanian professional football club from Drobeta-Turnu Severin
- CS Gaz Metan Drobeta-Turnu Severin
- Stadionul Municipal (Drobeta-Turnu Severin), city stadium
- Port of Drobeta Turnu Severin
