= Iron Gates Region Museum =

Coordinates: 44.6249°N 22.6665°E

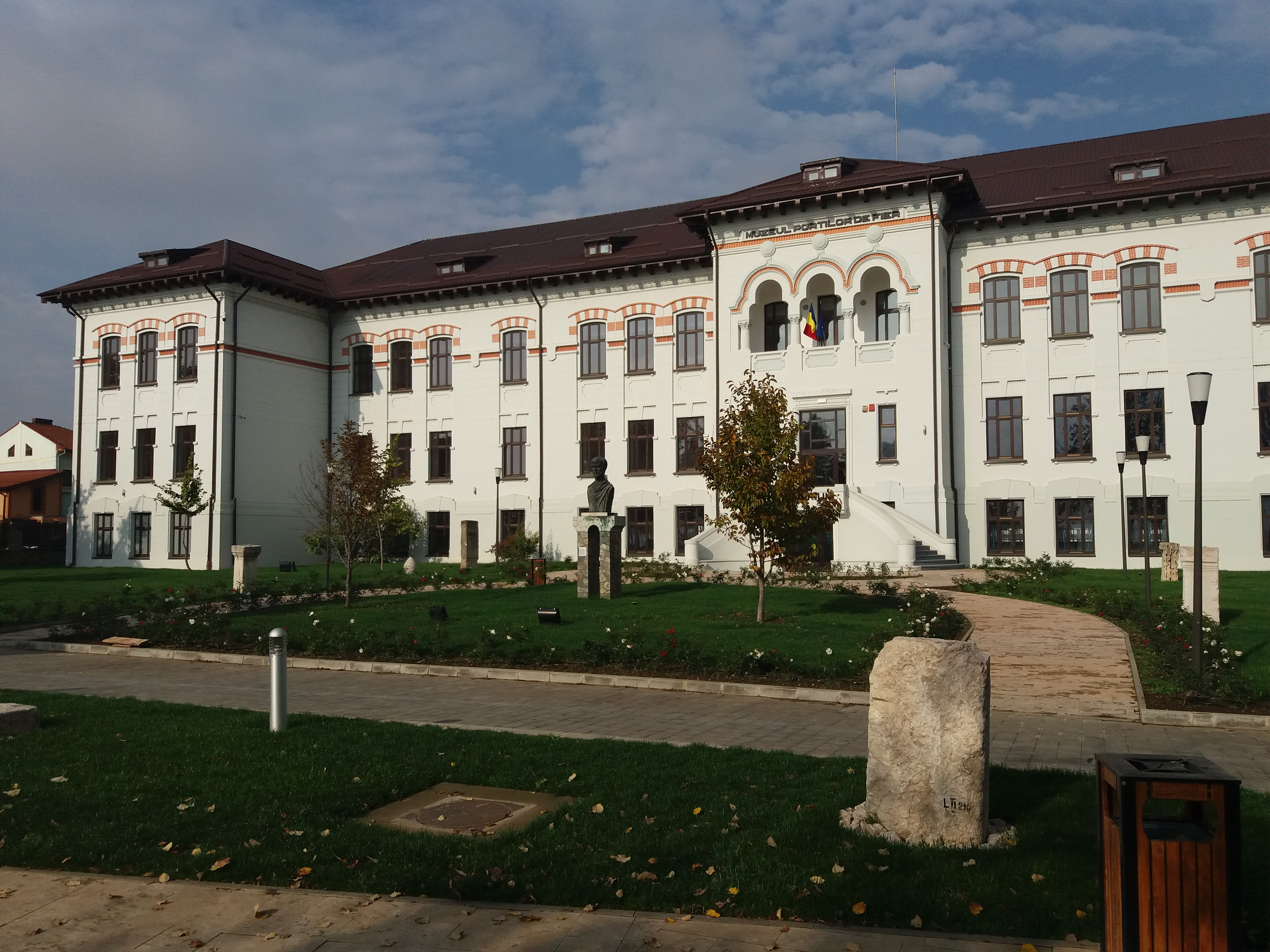
Iron Gates Museum renovated

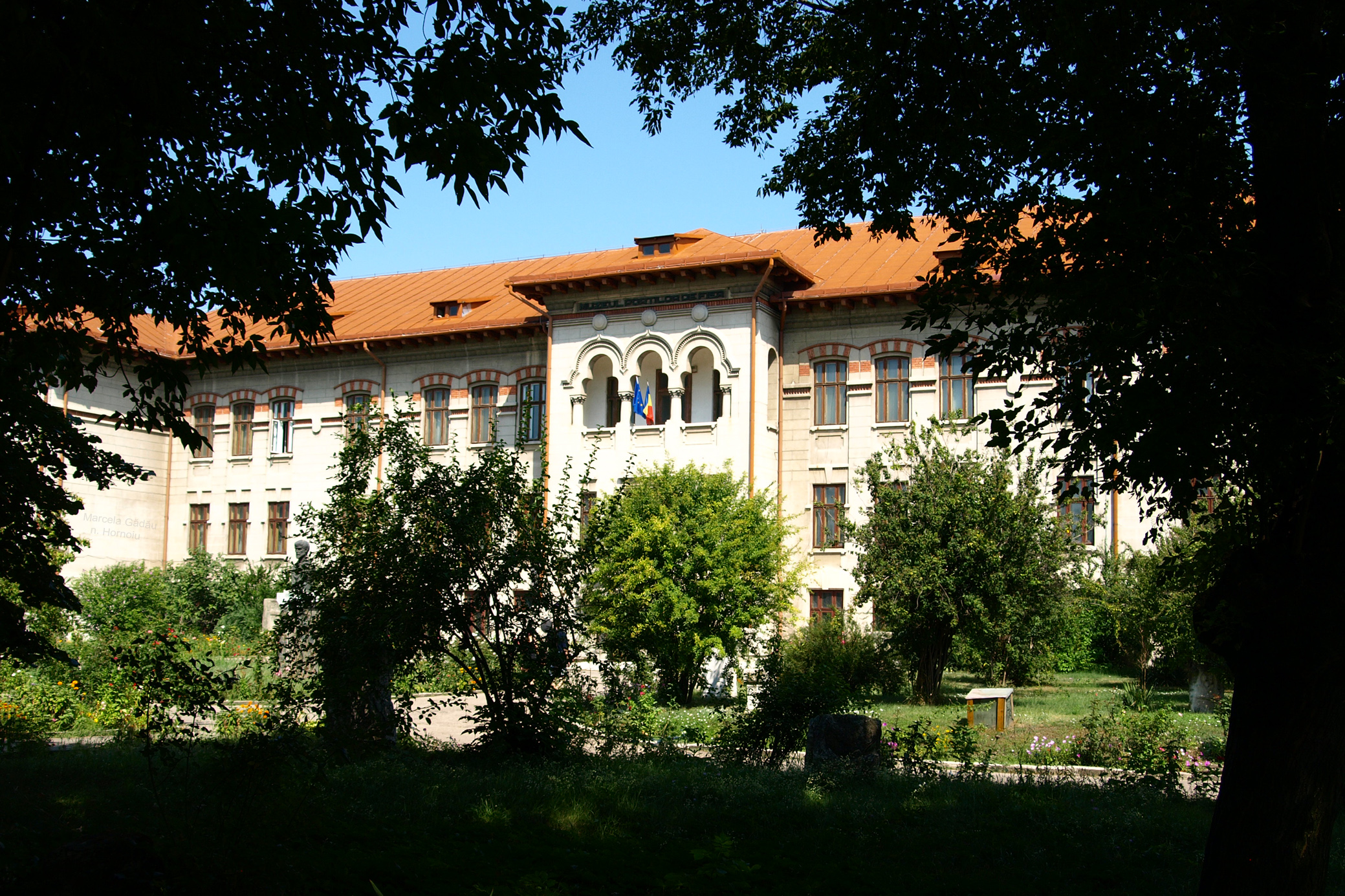
Iron Gates Region Museum

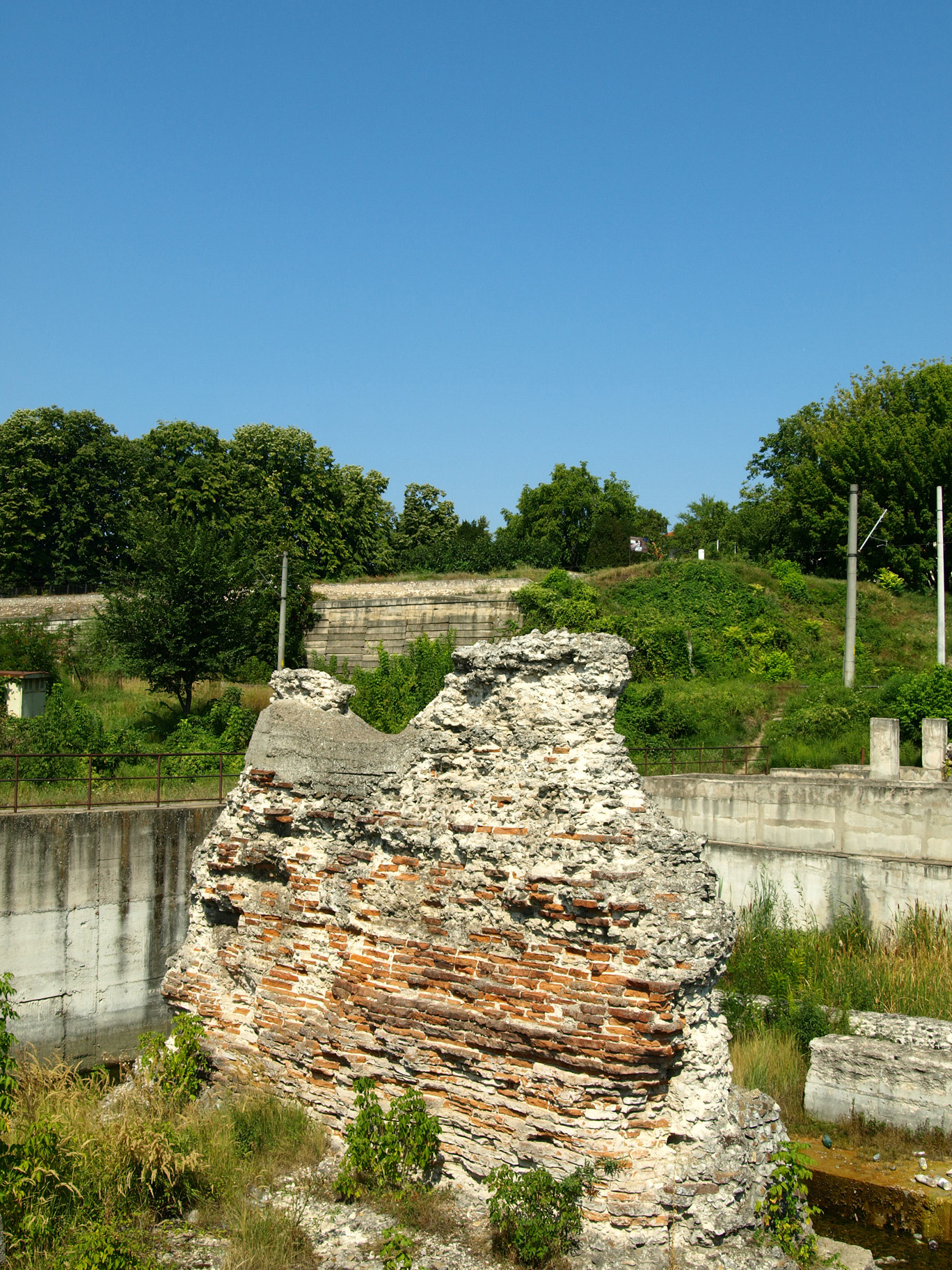
The ancient ruin of a pier of Trajan's Bridge on the Romanian shore of the Danube, in the immediate vicinity of the Museum.

The Iron Gates Region Museum (Romanian: Muzeul Regiunii Porţilor de Fier) is a museum in Drobeta-Turnu Severin, Romania.

== History ==
In 1912, Professor Alexandru Bărcăcilă established the "History Museum of Trajan High School". It was moved in 1926 to a new home near the Roman camp that formerly hosted a museum. It was then renamed the "Museum of History and Ethnography in Turnu Severin". After 1945, the museum grew in importance and developed its research area, under the name "Museum of the Iron Gates Region". On 15 May 1972, the museum opened with its present displays having two departments: history and natural sciences, with an aquarium presenting Danubian fish species. Later on ethnography and art departments were added.

== Exhibits ==
The exhibits include natural sciences (fauna and flora, an aquarium for the Danubian fauna and exotic fish), history, documents, archaeology (including prehistoric finds from Schela Cladovei, Roman finds from Drobeta and a lapidarium), numismatics, ethnography (costumes, pottery, textiles from Mehedinți and the Iron Gate areas).

The history — archaeology department comprises nine halls: Prehistory — the vestiges of the material and spiritual life of the Schela Cladovei culture, the Daco-Roman Wars, ancient Roman monuments (the bridge at Drobeta from the years 103 — 105), Mediaeval History, the Modern Age, Romanian Feudal Art and the Contemporary Age.

The natural sciences exhibition, inaugurated on 15 May 1972, presents the physical and geographical conditions of the Iron Gates Gorge, (Hall 1), the flora and fauna of the Iron Gates Gorge (Hall 2), the Danubian ichthyofauna of the Iron Gates storage basin (aquarium), and the water fauna in the Iron Gates region. The exhibition closes with aspects relating to cosmogony, paleontological evidence (testimonies regarding the origin and evolution of man).

The ethnography and folk art department holds a precious rich heritage, bearing documentary value. The exhibition presents first of all aspects on the rural civilization in the Iron Gates region. The museum owns goods listed in the National Cultural Heritage Treasures list.

Modern Romanian fine arts are also represented, with works by Luchian, Petrașcu, Pallady, Tonitza, Dimitrescu, Șirato, Stoenescu and Ressu.
