= Port of Drobeta-Turnu Severin =

Location
- Country: Romania
- Location: Mehedinți County

Details
- Owned by: Administratia Porturilor Dunarii Fluviale
- Type of harbour: Natural/Artificial
- Size: 137,600 square metres (13.76 ha)
- No. of berths: 7
- Employees: 38
- General manager: Ofiteru Danut

Statistics
- Annual cargo tonnage: 725,000 tonnes (2008)
- Annual revenue: US$ 900,000
- Website; Official site

The Port of Drobeta-Turnu Severin is one of the largest Romanian river ports, located in the city of Drobeta-Turnu Severin on the Danube River.
