= Sever Pleniceanu =

Romanian doctor and cartographer

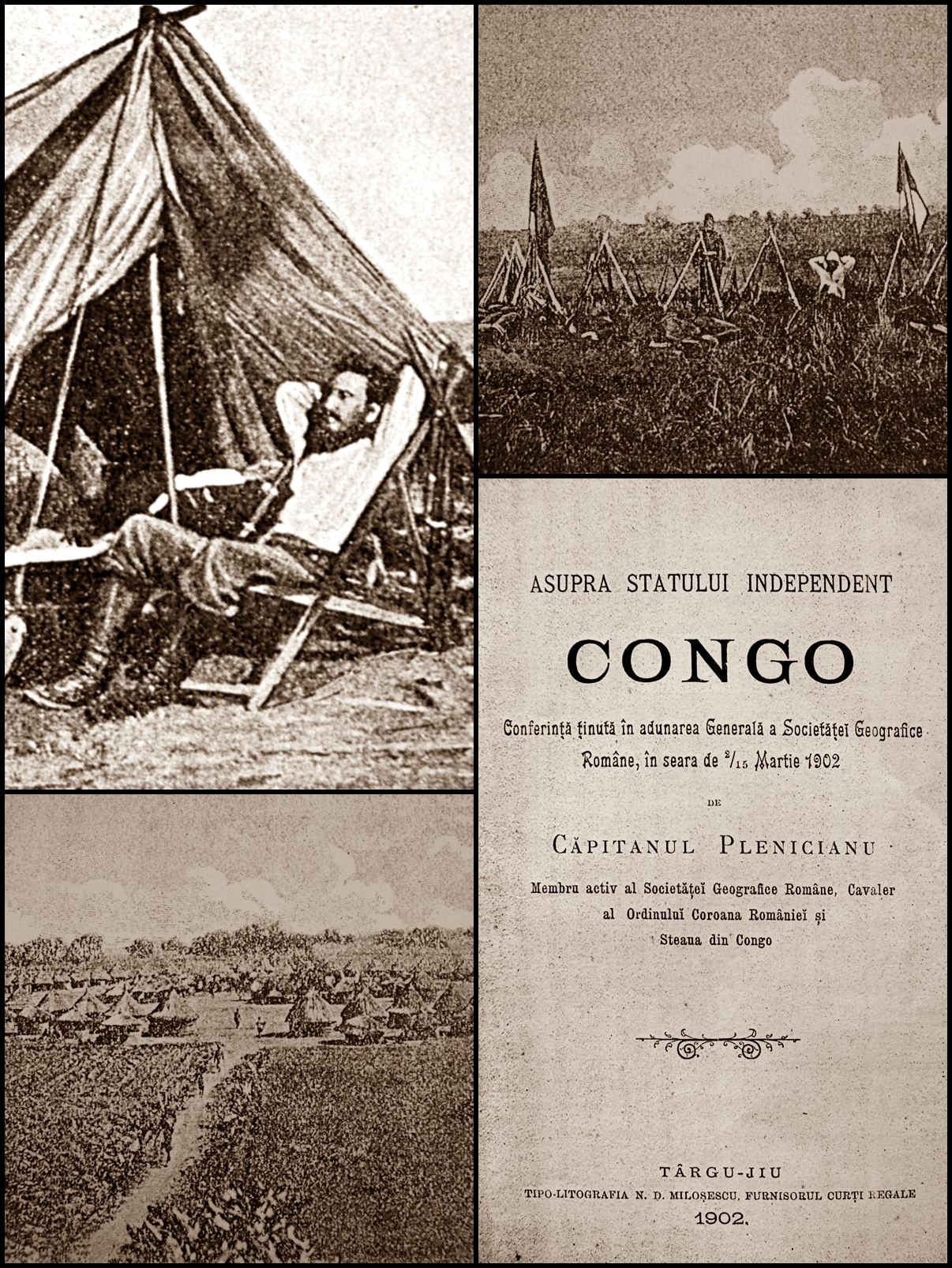
Travel Notes

Sever Pleniceanu (1867–1924) was a Romanian doctor, officer and cartographer. Commander of the Order of the Crown of Romania and the Star of the Congo.

== Early life and career ==
Pleniceanu was born in the Drobeta-Turnu Severin to a family of large landowners.

After finishing secondary school, he entered the cavalry school in Ypres, from which he graduated in 1891. After 7 years spent in the division of mounted gendarmes, where he was promoted to the rank of lieutenant, he resigned to embark on a long expedition to Africa, which lasted until 1901.

Captain Sever Plenichanu joined the Belgian colonial army and since 1898 to 1901, explored the region of Zaire and Sudan on the Congo River, studying the local inhabitants (Pygmies and cannibals) making geographical and climatic observations.
