= Coat of arms of Drobeta-Turnu Severin =

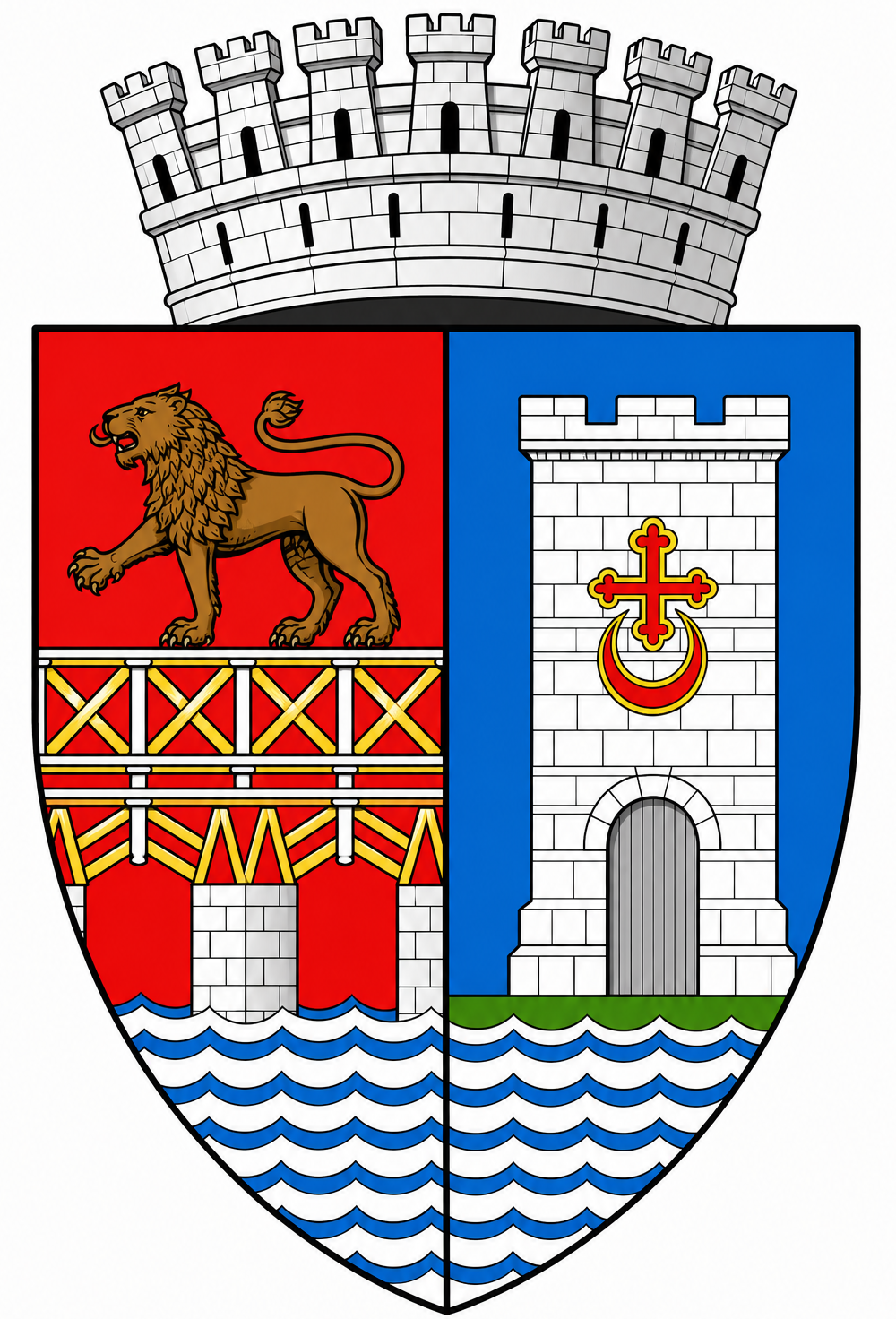
- Armiger: City Government
- Crest: A seven tower mural crown
- Supporters: None
- Motto: None
- Use: On the City hall's and Local Council's documents

The coat of arms of Drobeta-Turnu Severin is the official heraldic arms of the Romanian city of Drobeta-Turnu Severin.

== Description and symbolism ==
=== Elements of the coat of arms ===
The coat of arms of the city consists of a triangular shield with rounded edges, split. In the right, in red field, is a bridge supported by silver pillars above the waver water, all silver; on the bridge walk to the right a golden lion armed and with tongue. in the left, in blue field, is a square tower, embattled, silver, loaded with a cross above a crescent, both red. The tower is situated on a green terrace, exiting the silver waver water. Above the shield is a silver mural crown with 7 embattled towers.

=== Meanings of the elements ===
Bridge means the Apollodorus of Damascus bridge. Lion recalls, on the one hand, the old insignia of the Roman legions, and on the other hand, that once Severin belonged to the Banat of Oltenia. Tower evokes the Medieval Severin Fortress and cross above crescent recalls the battles against the Ottoman Empire. Mural crown with 7 towers embattled town means that the city has the rank of county residence.

== Sources and References ==
- Hotararea de Guvern nr. 511 din 30 iunie 2007 privind aprobarea stemelor municipiilor Drobeta-Turnu Severin și Orșova, județul Mehedinți (Government Decision no. 511 of 30 June 2007 approving coat of arms for the cities of Drobeta-Turnu Severin and Orșova, Mehedinti County) (in Romanian)
