= Drobeta-Turnu Severin =

- Municipality
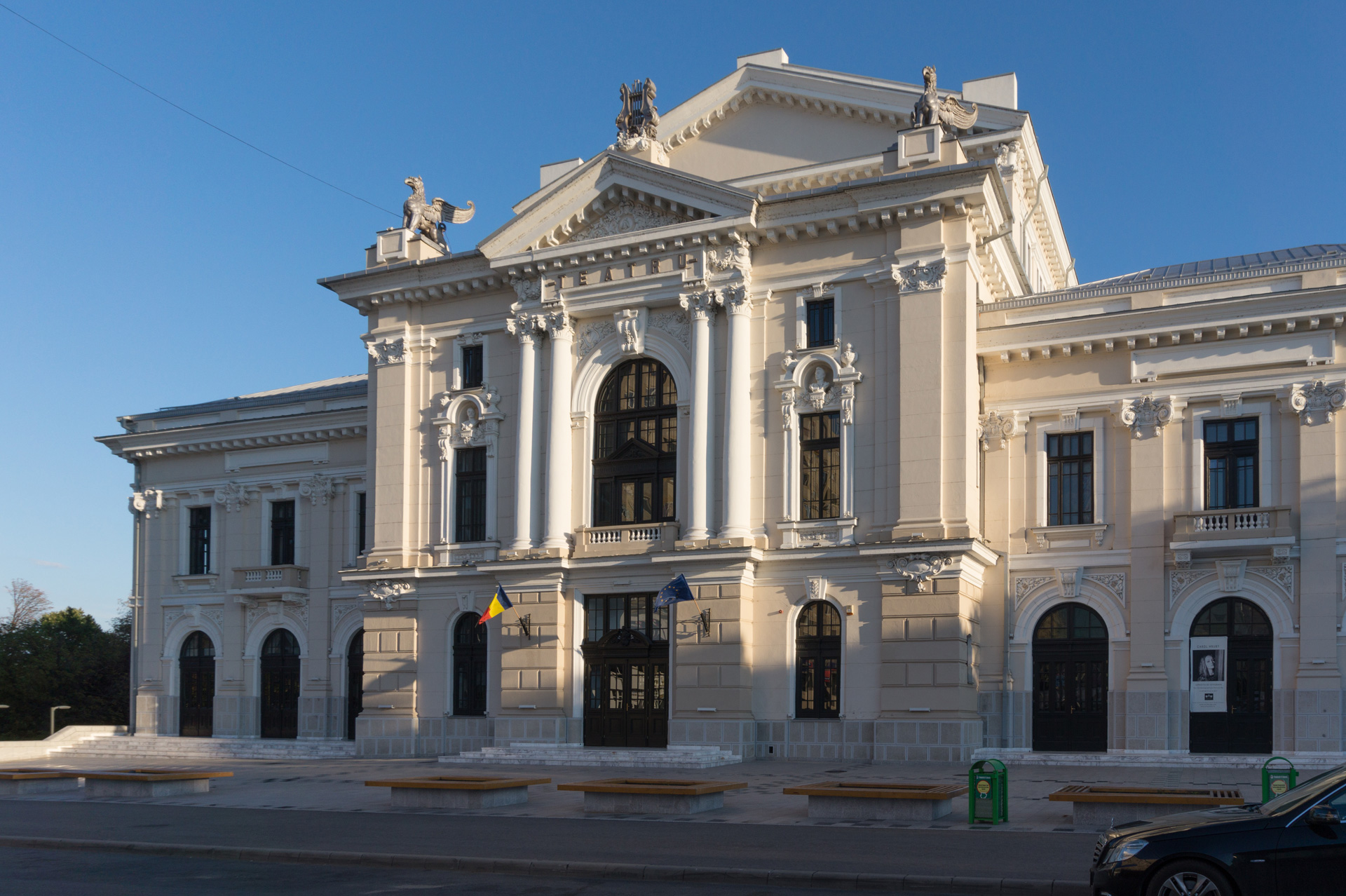
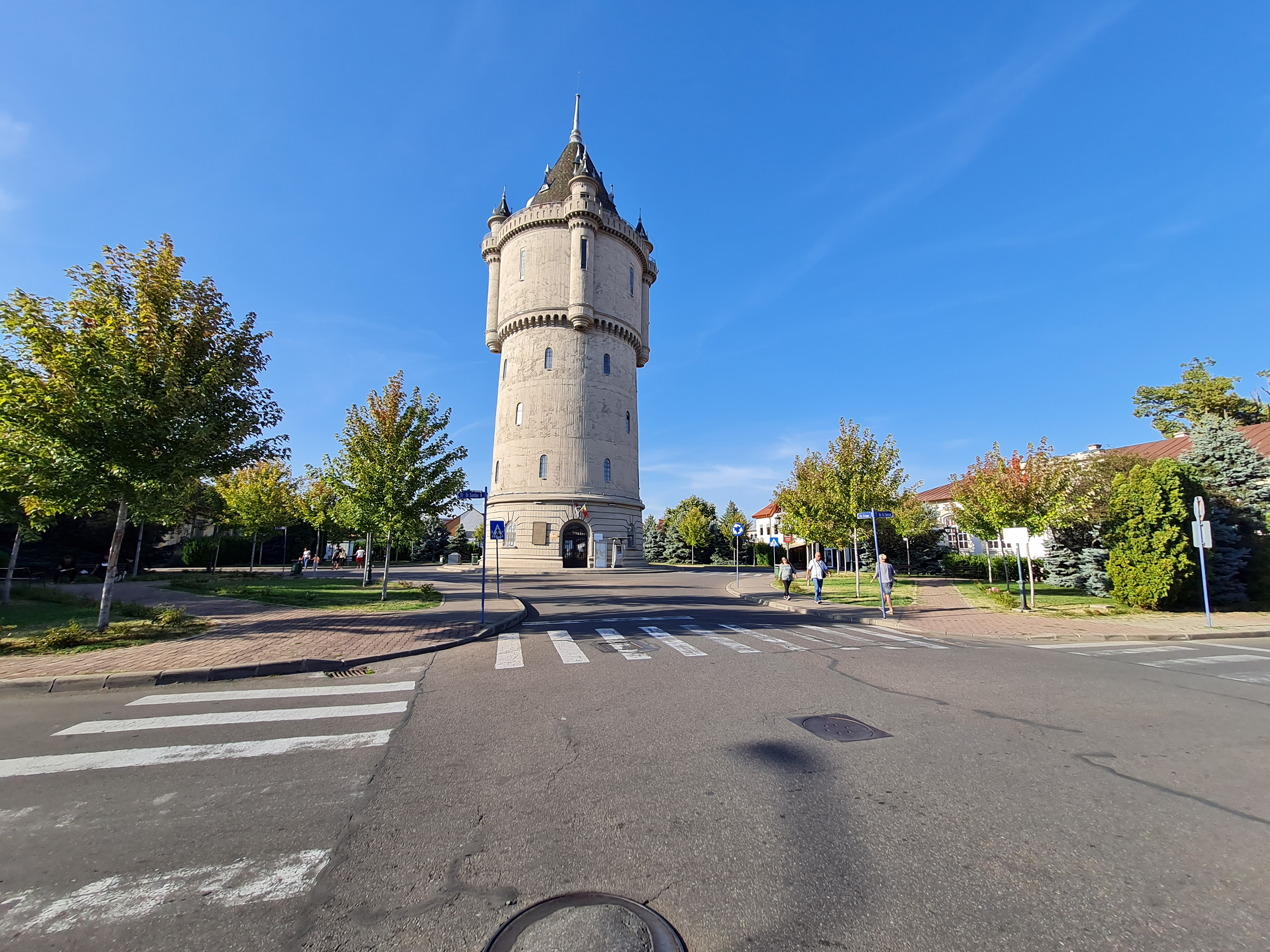
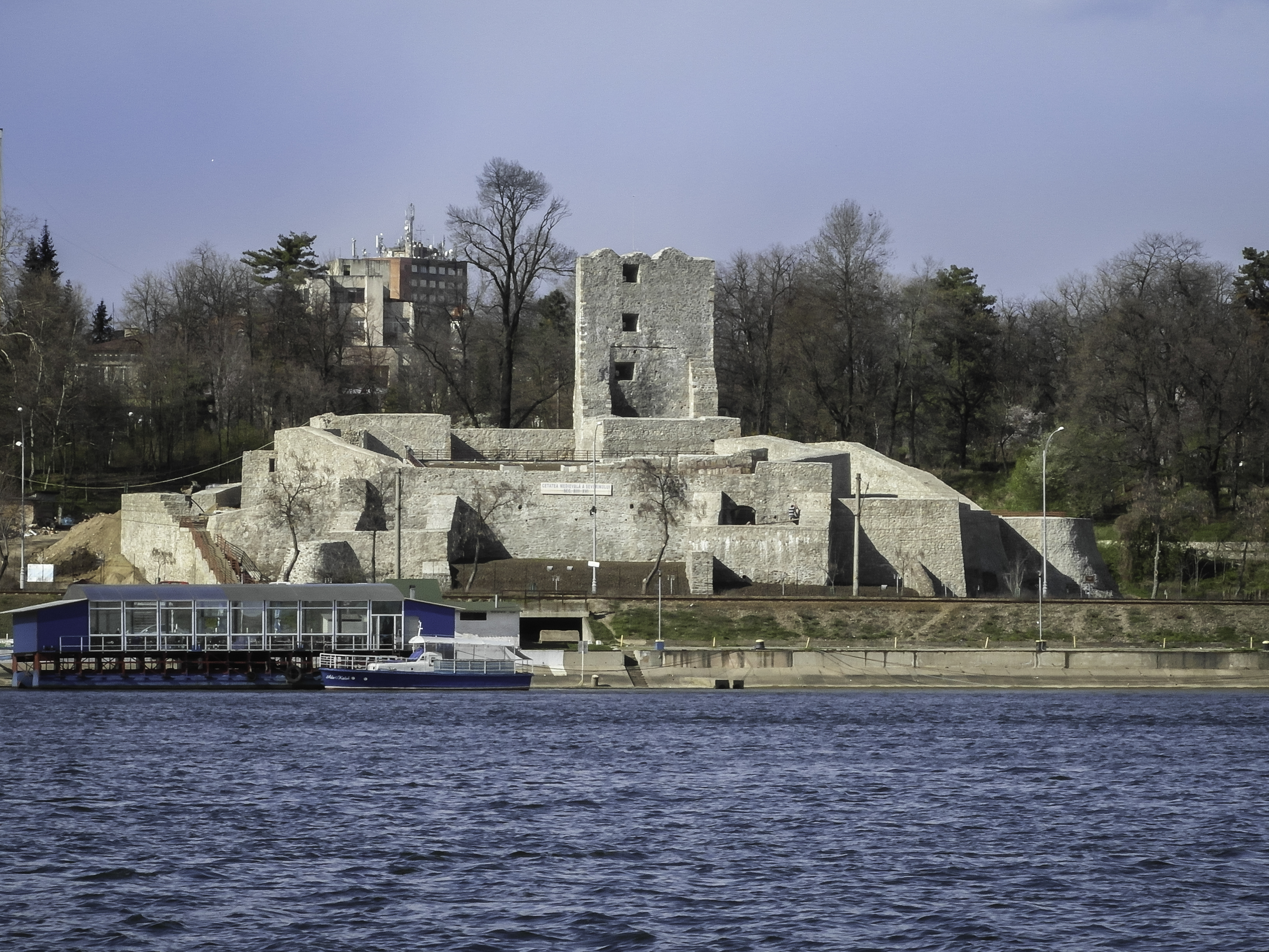
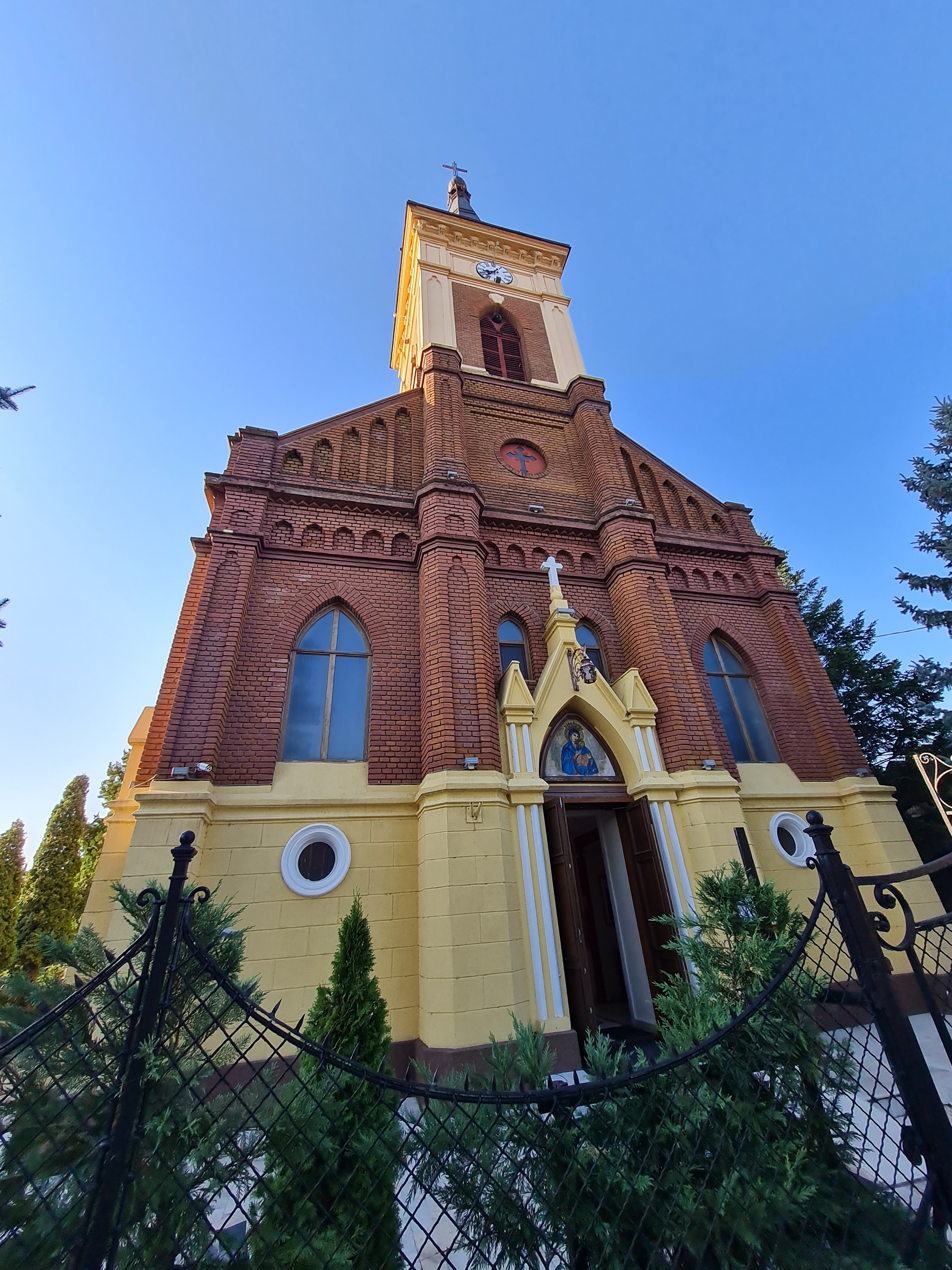
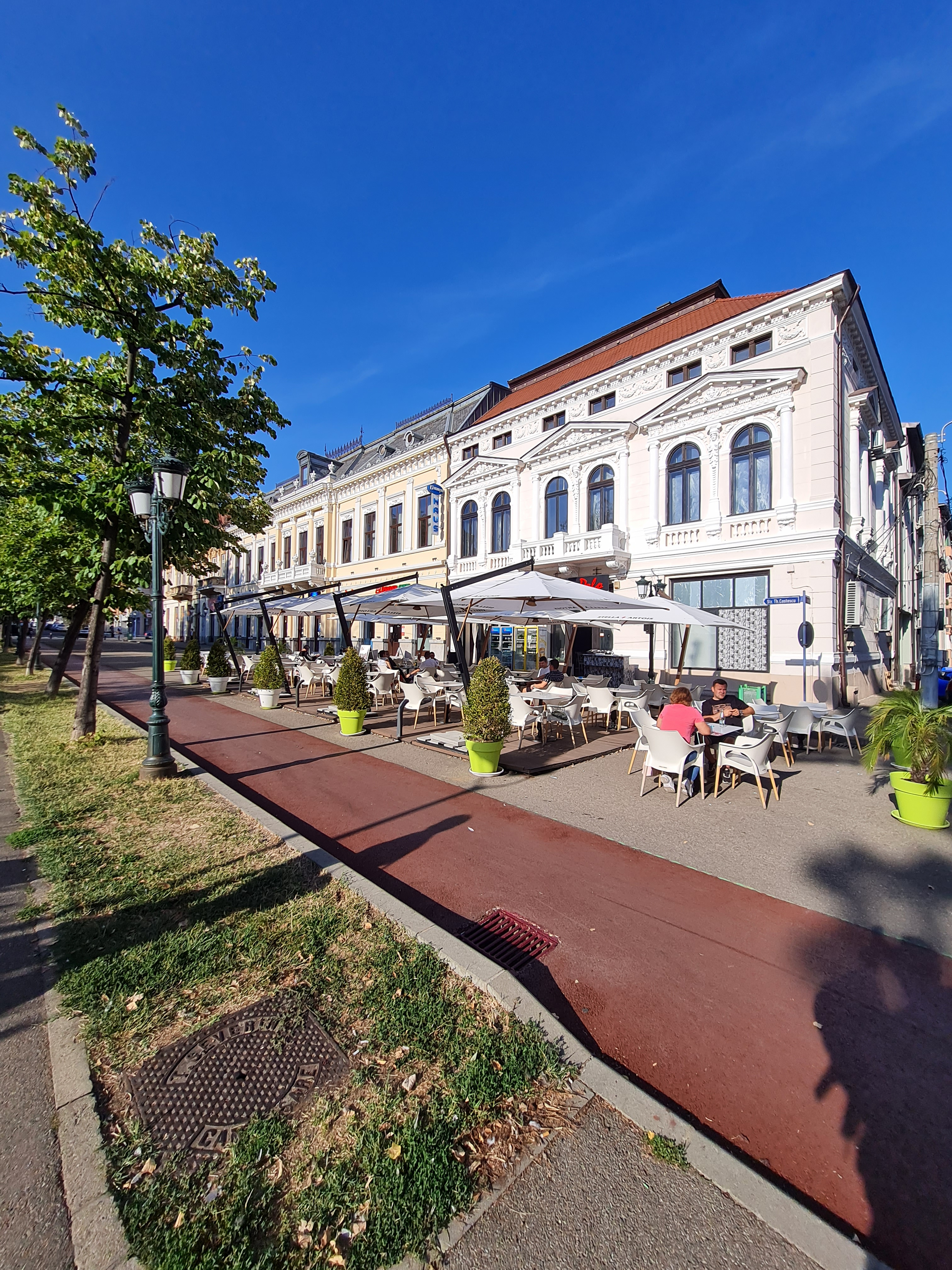
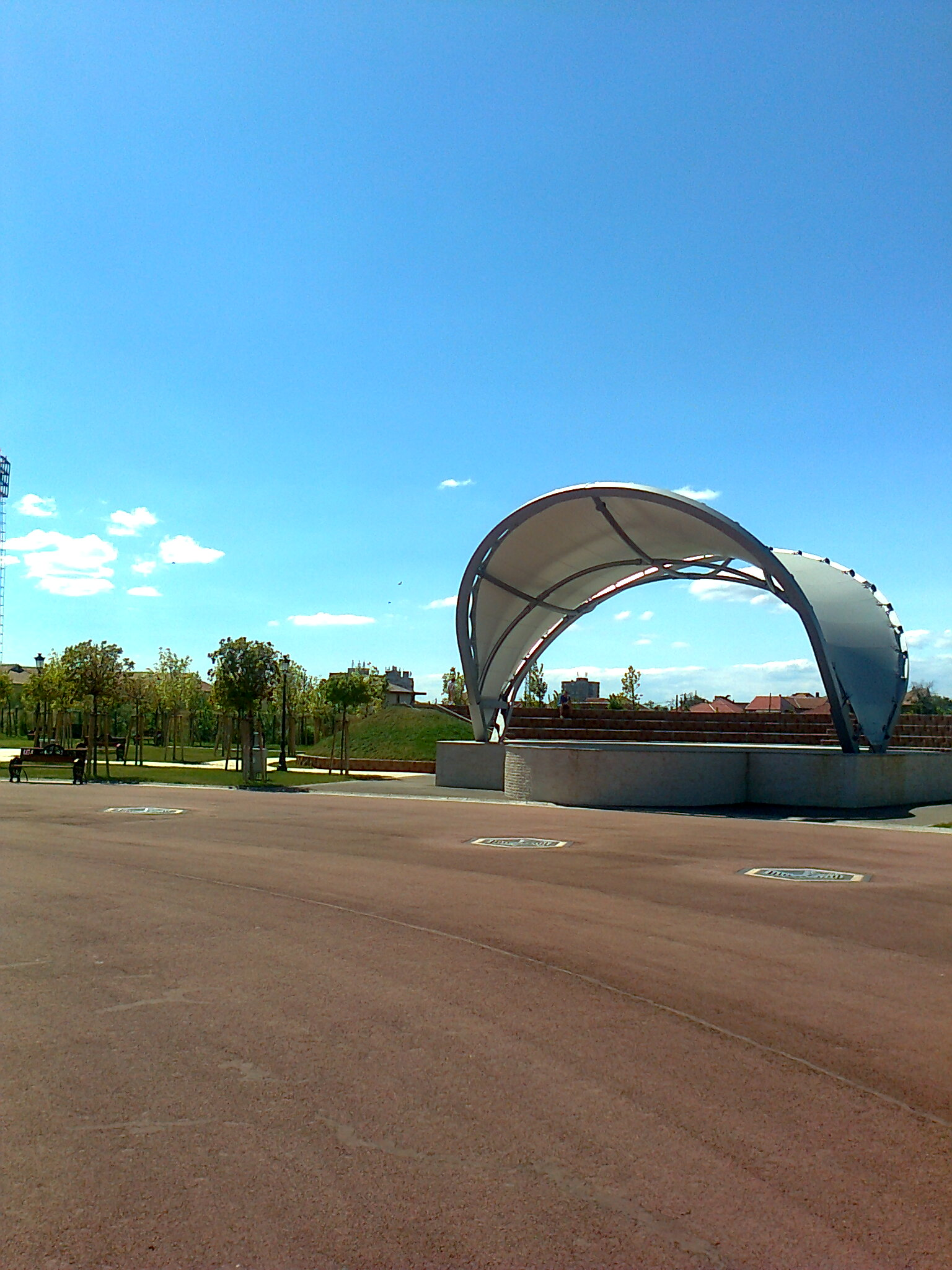
- Teodor Costescu - Cultural palace Water castle Severin Fortress The catholic church Costescu T. street Pedestrianized area

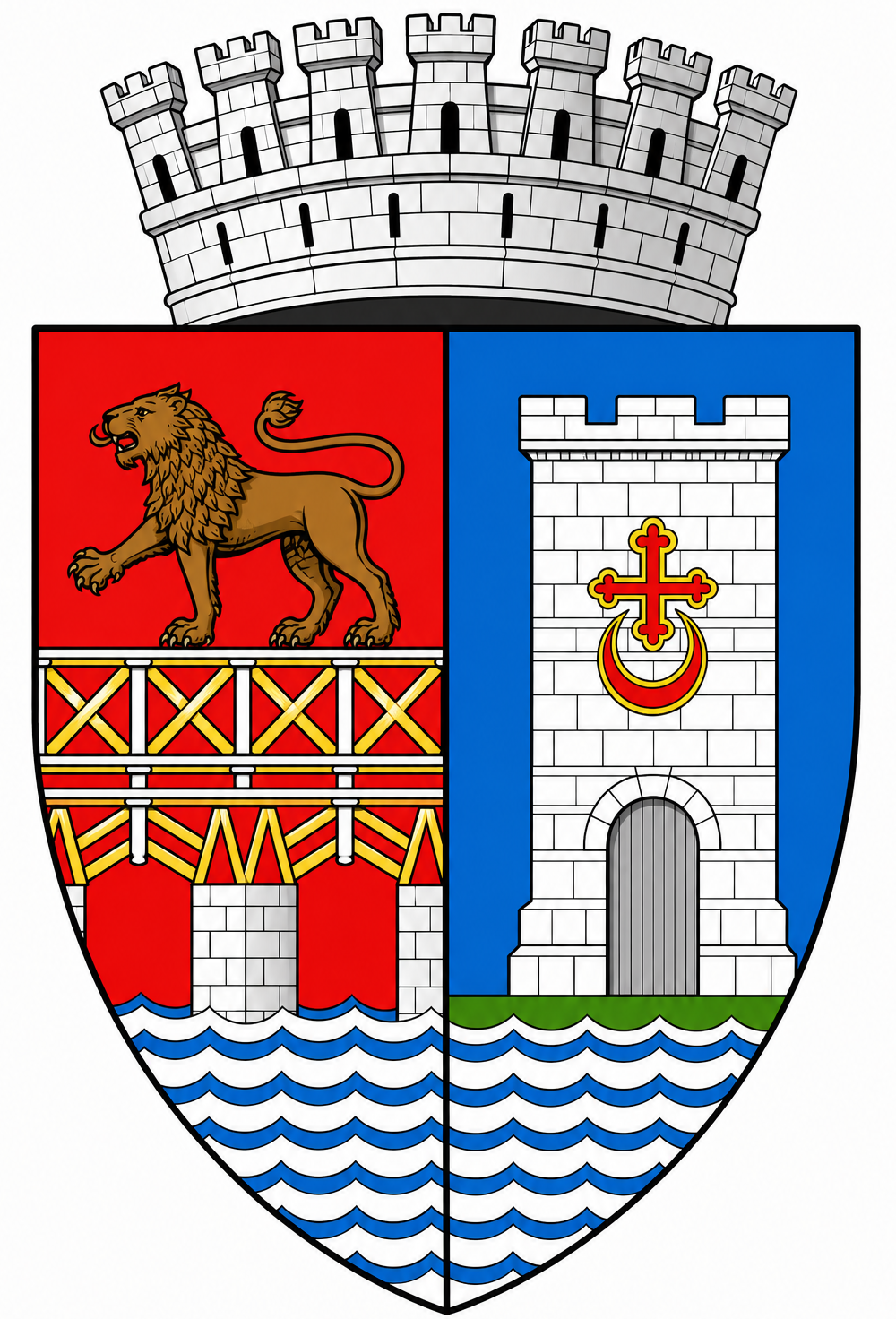
- Coat of arms

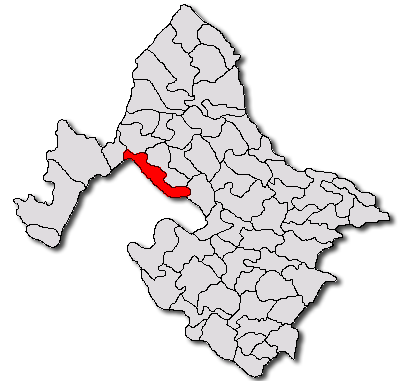
- Location within Mehedinți County

- Location in Romania
- Coordinates: 44°38′N 22°39′E
- Country: Romania
- County: Mehedinți

Government
  - Mayor (2024–2028): Marius Screciu (PSD)
- Area: 55 km^{2} (21 sq mi)
- Elevation: 65 m (213 ft)
- Population (2021-12-01): 79,865
  - Density: 1,500/km^{2} (3,800/sq mi)
- Time zone: UTC+02:00 (EET)
  - Summer (DST): UTC+03:00 (EEST)
- Postal code: 220004–220256
- Area code: (+40) 02 52
- Vehicle reg.: MH
- Website: www.primariadrobeta.ro

Drobeta-Turnu Severin (Romanian pronunciation: [droˈbeta ˈturnu seveˈrin]), colloquially Severin, is a city in Mehedinți County, Oltenia, Romania, on the northern bank of the Danube, close to the Iron Gates. It is one of six Romanian county seats lying on the river Danube. "Drobeta" is the name of the ancient Dacian and Roman towns at the site, and the modern town of Turnu Severin received the additional name of Drobeta during Nicolae Ceaușescu's national-communist dictatorship as part of his myth-making efforts.

== Etymology ==
Drobeta was originally a Dacian town. The Roman fort built by Emperor Trajan at the site preserved the Dacian name. (see "History" section). According to Hamp and Hyllested, Drobeta reflects a Roman misinterpretation of *Druwā-tā (the wooden place) with a postposed article, reflecting a proto-Albanian syntax for wood druwa-tai.

"Severin" was originally linked by historians with the Roman Emperor Septimius Severus, during whose reign the name of the city was Drobeta Septimia Severiana. However, the name may be derived from Old Church Slavonic severno ("northern"), from sěverъ, "north". Another possibility is that Severin's name was taken in memory of Severinus of Noricum, who was the patron saint of the medieval colony Turnu, initially a suffragane of the Diocese of Kalocsa.

Turnu ("Tower") refers to a tower on the north bank of the Danube built by the Byzantines. Thus, the name of the city would mean "Northern Tower".

== History ==
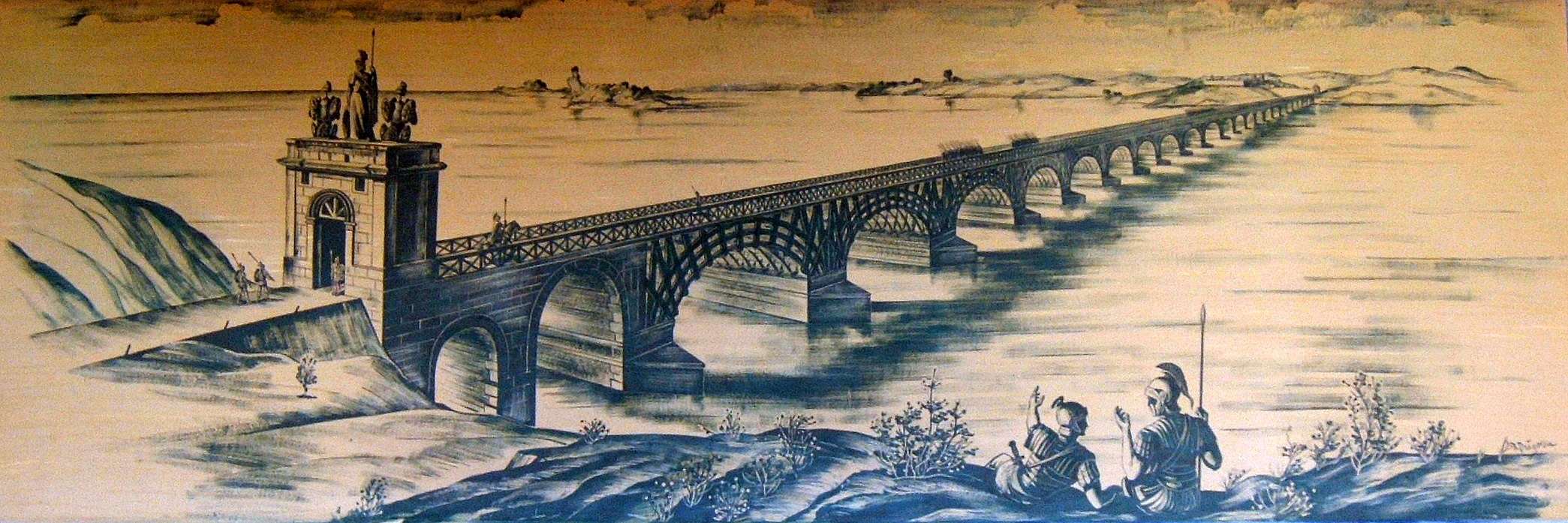
1907 reconstruction of Trajan's Bridge across the Danube by engineer E. Duperrex

The city of Drobeta inside the province of Dacia

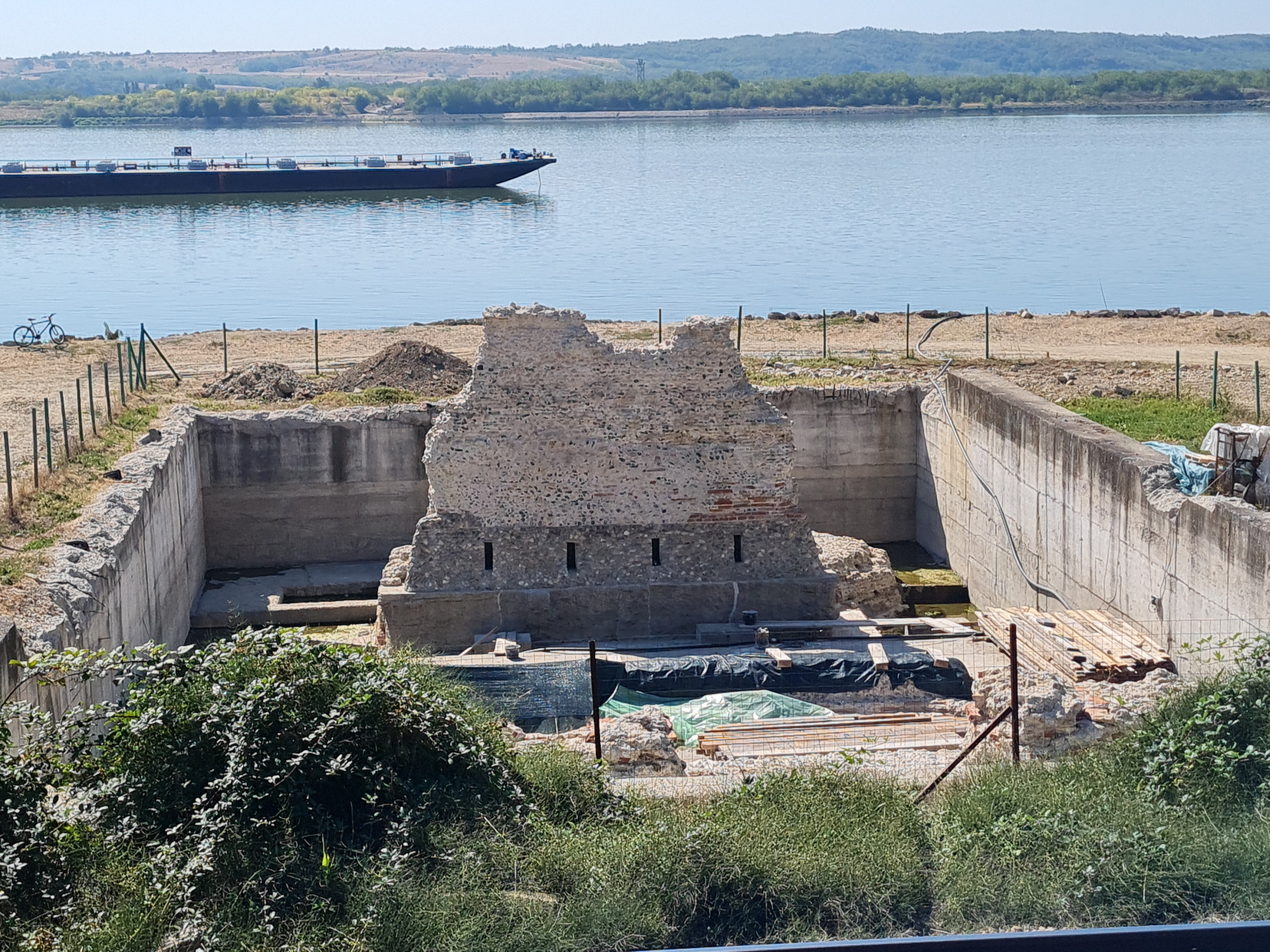
Trajan's Bridge northern bank

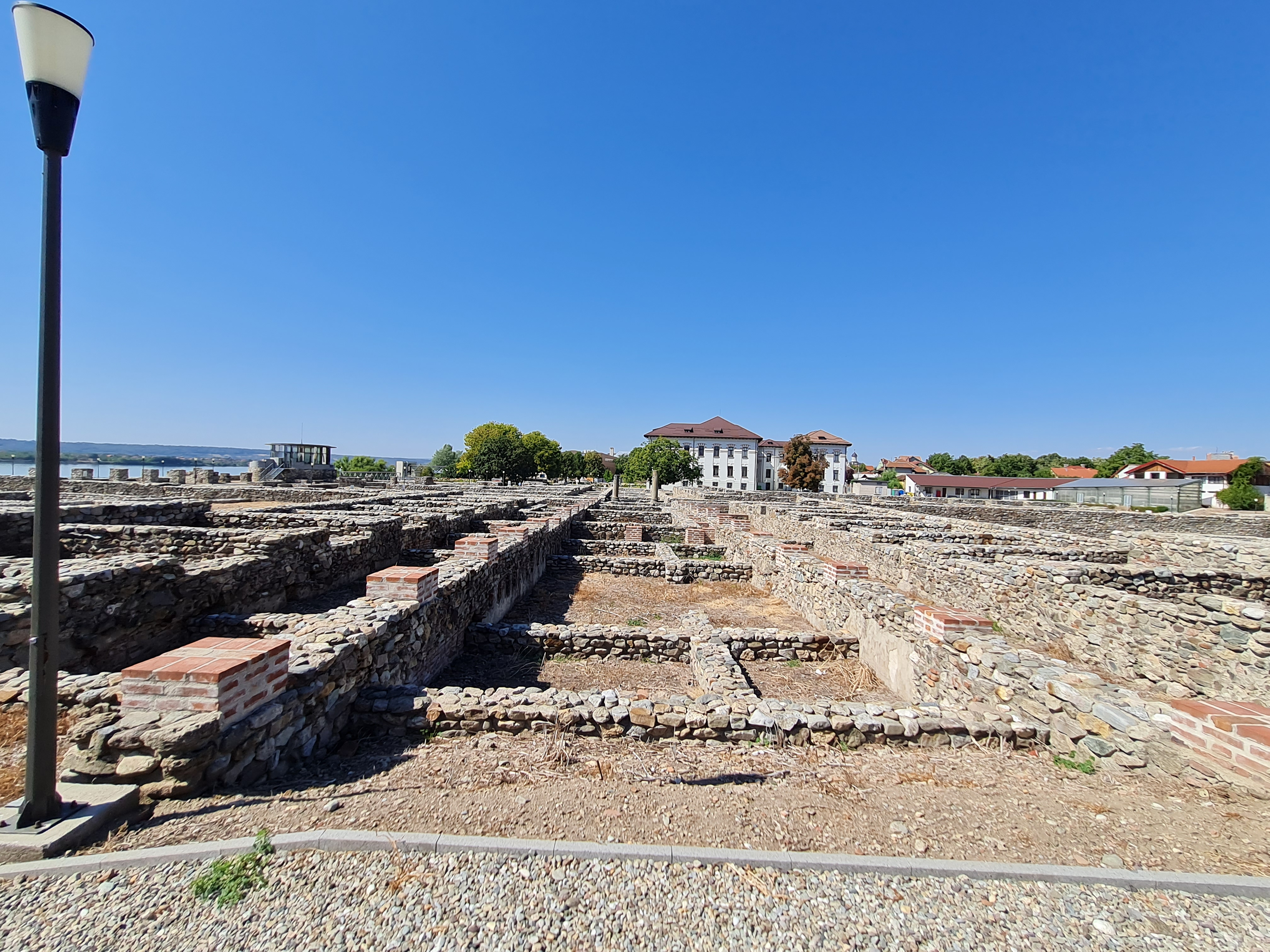
Roman fort

=== Dacian and Roman Eras ===
Drobeta was first a Dacian town mentioned by Greek geographer Ptolemy of Alexandria (2nd century AD).

Trajan's Bridge was built here to cross the Danube in only three years (AD 103–105) by his favourite architect Apollodorus of Damascus for his invasion of Dacia which ended with Roman victory in 106 AD. The bridge was considered one of the most daring works in the Roman world. The bridge was composed of twenty arches between stone piers, two of which are visible. Each bridgehead had its own fort and portal monument, whose remains can still be seen on both sides of the Danube.

Drobeta grew as a strategic point at the crossing of water and land routes which led to the north and south of the Danube. It became the third urban centre in Dacia after Sarmizegetusa and Apullum. During the reign of Emperor Hadrian (AD 117–138), the settlement was declared a municipium in 121. At this point the population had reached 14,000. In 193 during the reign of Septimius Severus (193–211), the city was raised to the rank of a colony which gave its residents equal rights with citizens of Rome. As a colony, Drobeta was a thriving city with temples, a basilica, a theatre, a forum, a port and guilds of craftsmen. In the middle of the 3rd century, Drobeta covered an area of 60 hectares and had a population of almost 40,000 inhabitants.

After the retreat of the Roman administration from Dacia in the 4th century, the city was preserved under Roman occupation as a bridgehead on the north bank of the Danube until the 6th century. Destroyed by Huns in the 5th century, it was rebuilt by Justinian I (527-565).

==== Sights ====
On the bank of the Danube are the remains of the celebrated Trajan's Bridge, the longest in the Empire. Here the Danube is about 1,200 m (3,900 ft) wide.

The bridgehead fort has been extensively excavated and is visible today.

Also visible are the extensive remains of the large Roman thermal baths and amphitheatre.

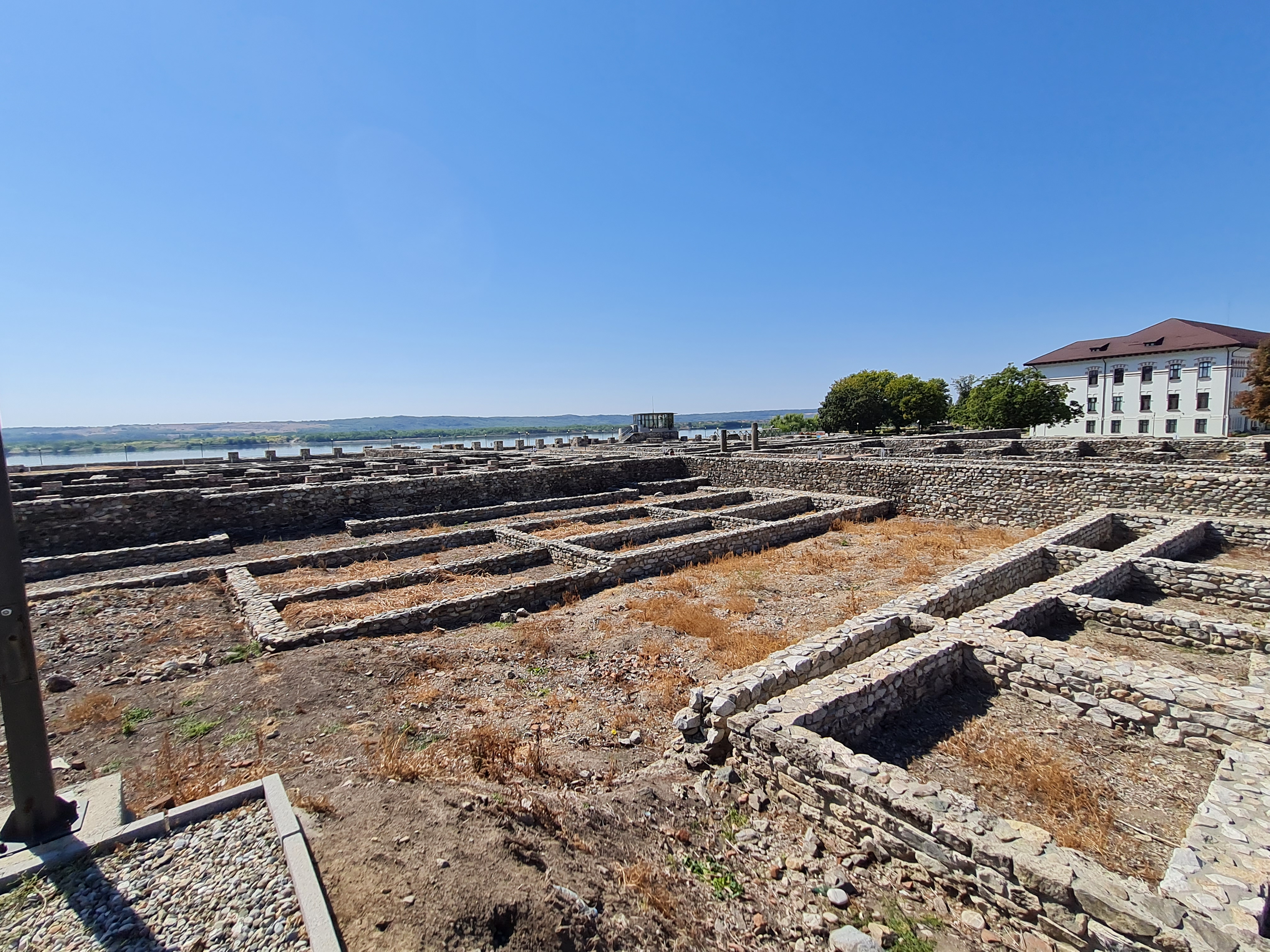

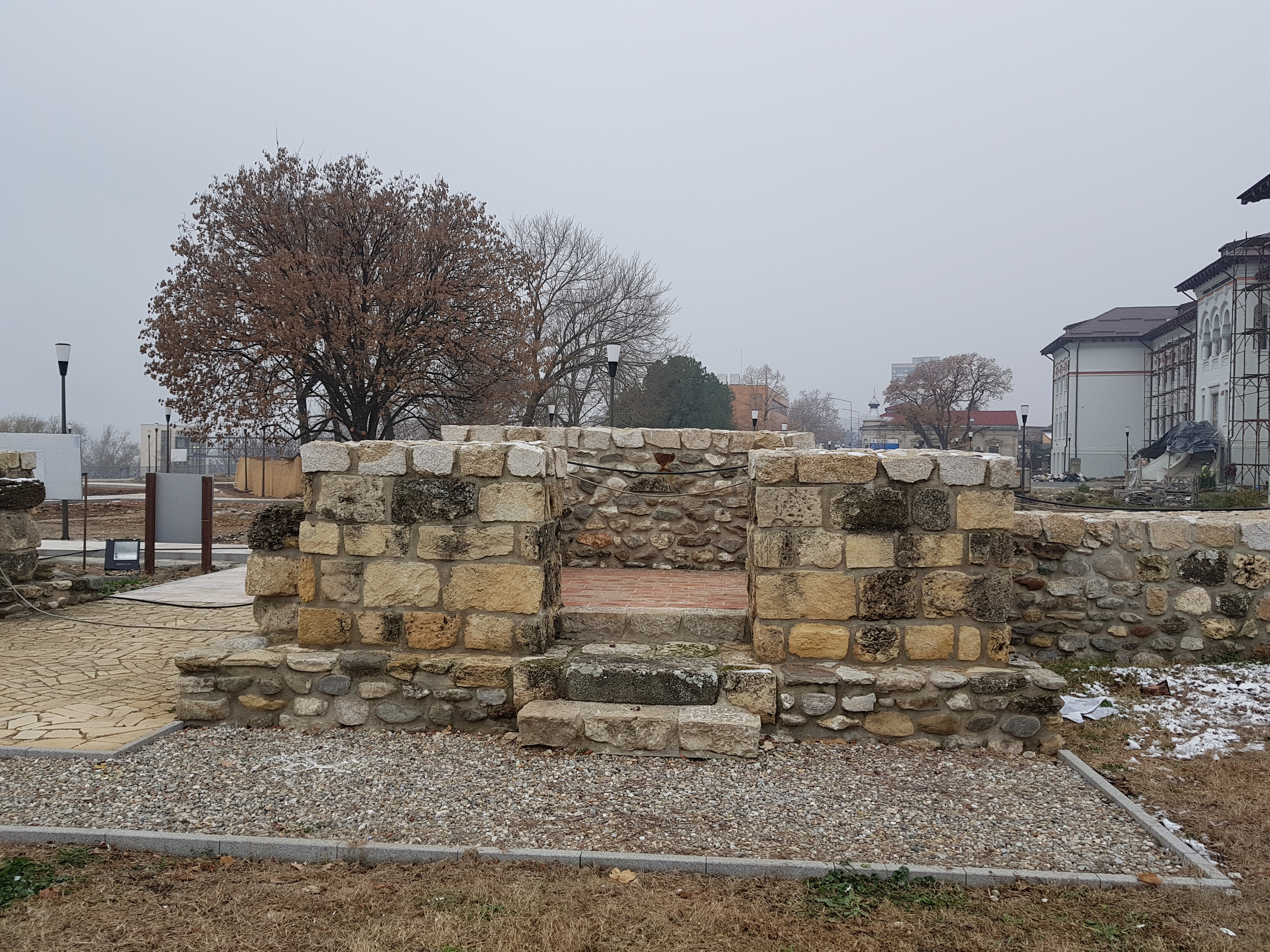

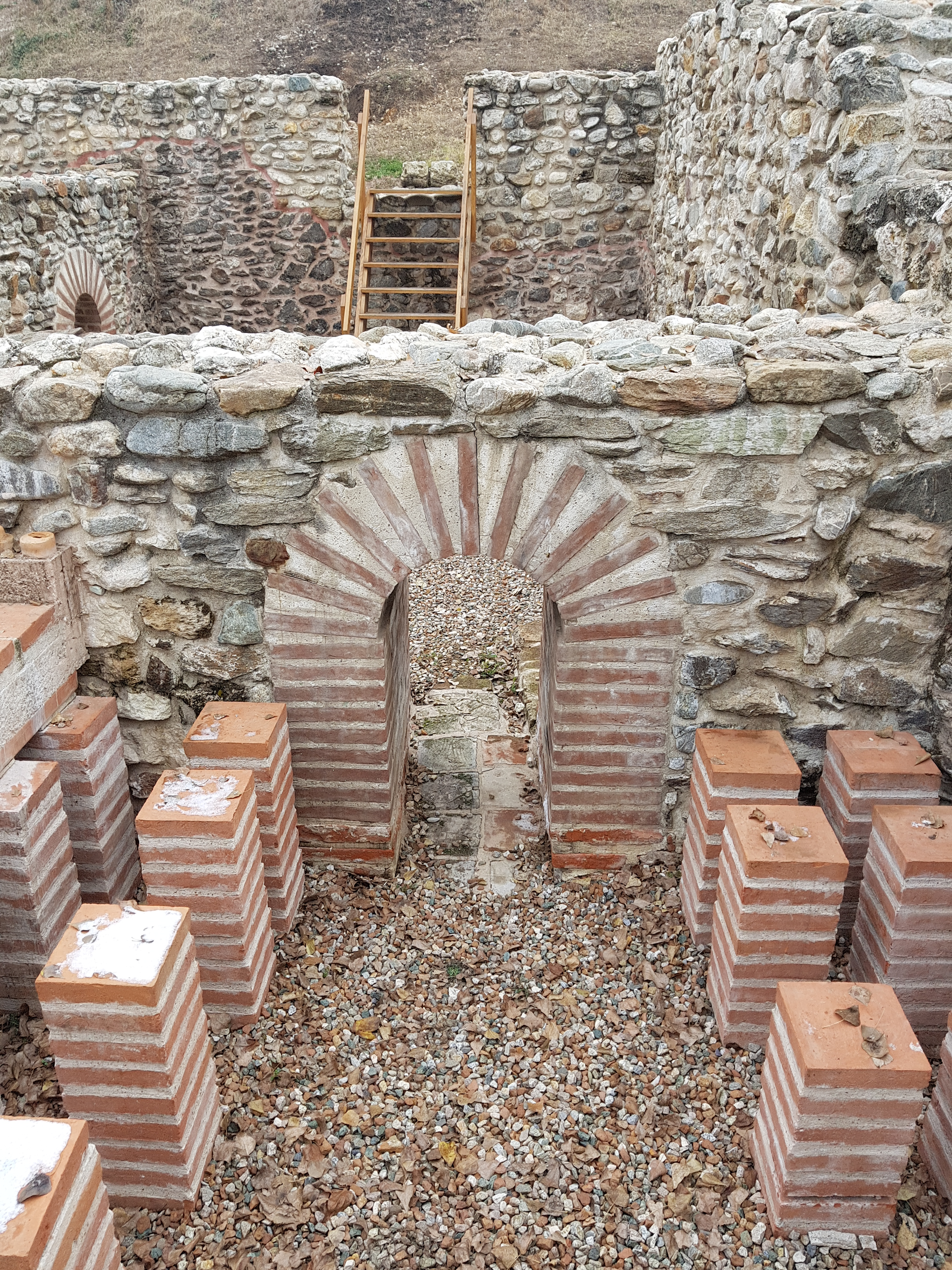
Baths

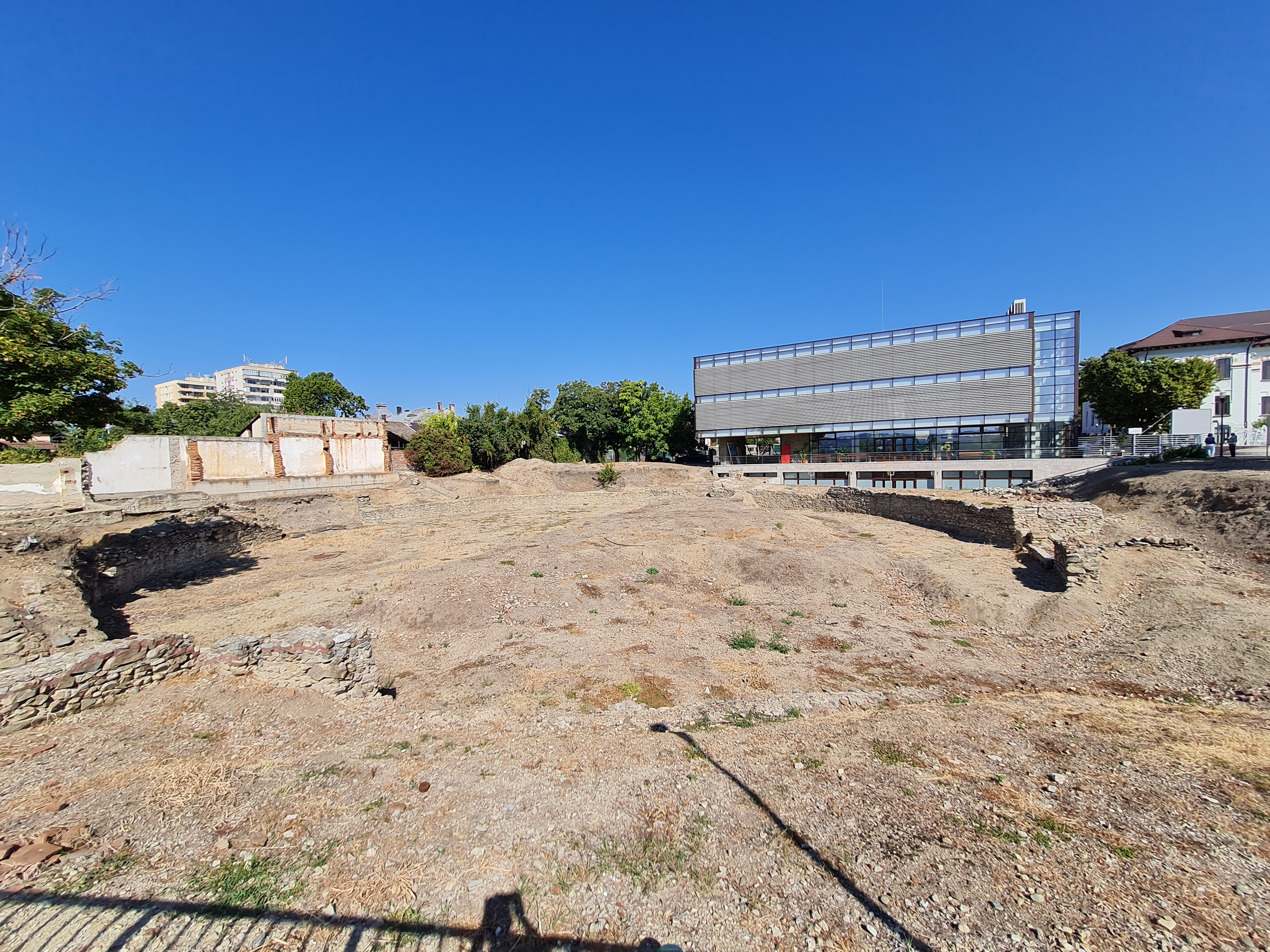
Roman Amphitheatre

=== Middle Ages ===
The fortress of Severin was built by the Kingdom of Hungary under Ladislaus I (1077–1095) as a strategical point against the Second Bulgarian Empire. Along with the forming of the Vlach/Romanian Voivodeships, the Severin fortress was a reason for a war over a period of several generations between Oltenian Voievodes (Litovoi, Bărbat, then Basarab I) and Hungarians. The war ended with the Battle of Posada. Romanians then fought the Ottoman Empire, which threatened the area of the Danube. In this context, castles on the banks of the river, the area from Iron Gates to Calafat, began to be restored.

When the Hungarians attacked Oltenia and conquered Severin's fortress, Andrew II of Hungary organized the Banate of Severin. The first Ban of Severin, Luca, was mentioned in 1233. This year may be taken as the date of birth of a new castle over the ruins of Drobeta, under the name Severin (Severinopolis). It was a basis for the Banate of Severin, Terra Zeurino (Țara Severinului – Country of Severin). Severin's name was taken in memory of Severinus of Noricum, who was the patron saint of the medieval colony Turnu, initially a suffragane of the Diocese of Kalocsa.

In 1247, the Hungarian Kingdom brought the Knights of St. John to the country, giving them Severin as a residence, where they built the medieval castle of Severin (this is the Castrul Zeurini mentioned in Diploma of the Joannites in 1247). Inside the strong fort a Gothic church was erected. This was presumably the headquarters of the Catholic episcopate of Severin that was there until 1502. The knights withdrew in 1259, while the fortress remained in the range of the cannons of Turks, Bulgarians and Tatars who wanted to cross the Danube. The Hungarians still wanted to attack Oltenia.

Severin Fortress was the most important strategic redoubt on the Danube. Its conquest meant to gain an important bridgehead in the region.

Romanian Voivodes have also fought for this powerful fortress, conquering it or claiming it from time to time. Litovoi and Basarab I died at this fortress. Mircea the Elder (Mircea cel Bătrân) established Bănia Severinului (Banate of Severin) and, in 1406, concluded a treaty of alliance with Sigismund of Hungary right in Severin. After the death of Mircea, Sigismund freed the Severin Fortress occupied by the Turks, and even made some concessions to the monasteries of Vodița and Tismana. Then Banate of Severin returned to John Hunyadi, who consolidated all the castles on the Danube. Around 1432, possession passed to the Wallachian voivodes.

After the fall of Constantinople in 1453, attacks on the Danubian fortresses were made, moving the Banate residence to Strehaia, the Severin population migrating to the Cerneți village, 6 km north, which became the capital of the Mehedinți district. In 1524, after a devastating attack by the Turks led by Suleiman the Magnificent, only one tower of the Severin fortress was left standing, which led the people to name it Turnul lui Severin (Tower of Severinus). Severin remained under Ottoman rule until 1829 except a Wallachian occupation between 1594 and 1599 and an Austrian one between 1718 and 1738. Under Ottoman occupation, the territory's administration moved to the west of Oltenia and was centered in Cerneţi.

In 1936, Prof. Dr. Al. Bărăcilă executed excavations at the fortress, where he managed to reconstruct the layout of the castle and recovered rich archaeological materials (rails, iron, copper, stone cannonballs, pipe of a bronze cannon etc.). The fortress was rectangular shaped with two walls made of unprocessed river stones, glued with mortar. In the center of the castle there was a chapel, surrounded by graves, built in part with materials taken from Drobeta Castrum. Also in the fortress was an oven-hearth serving a weapons workshop. Inside the interior, to the north, was a tower with three floors used for defense; to the east a second tower, thicker, at the angle of the wall. The entrance to the castle was through a gate dome and the fortress was surrounded by a deep moat.

=== Modern times ===
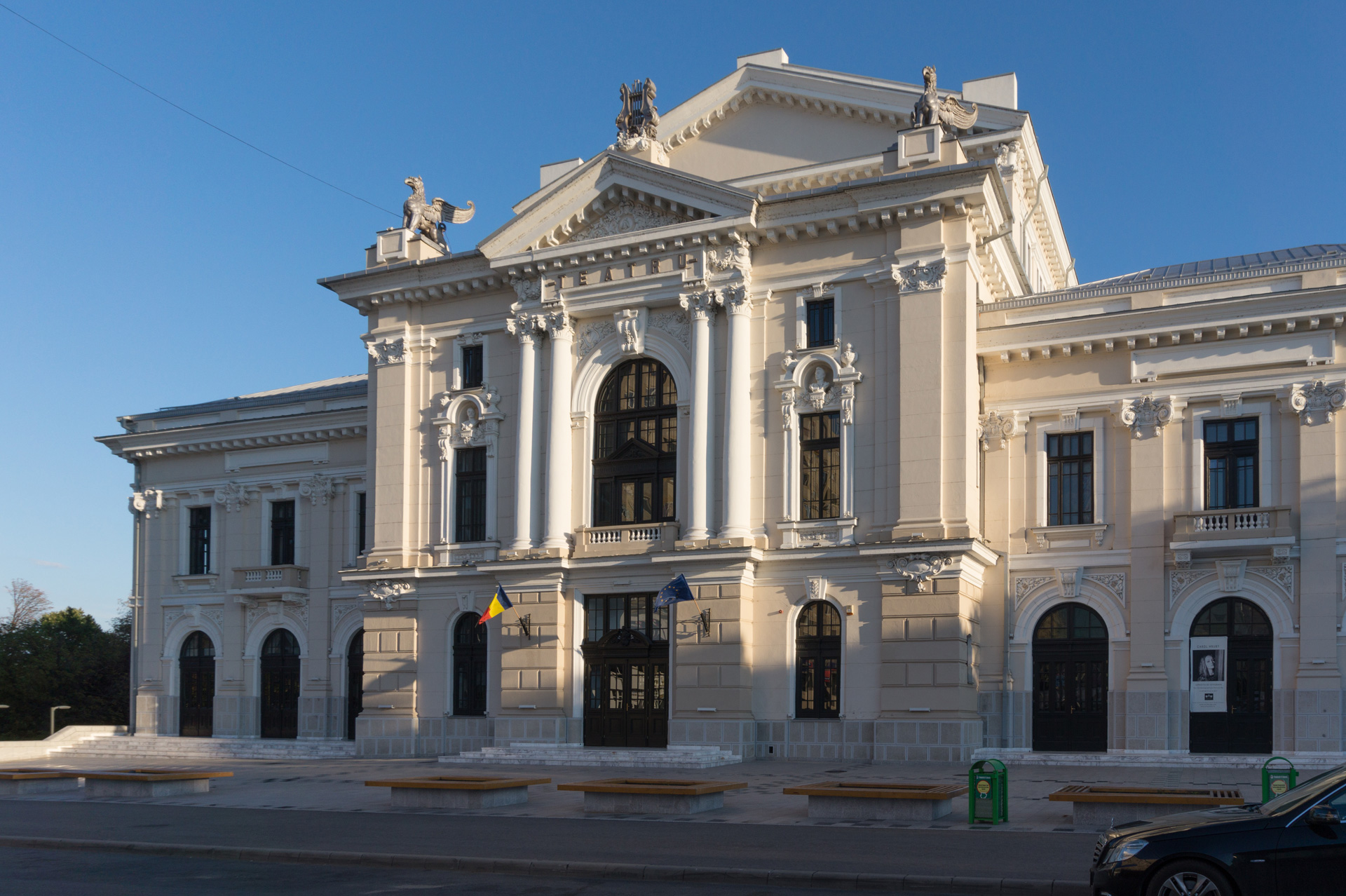
The Palace of Culture

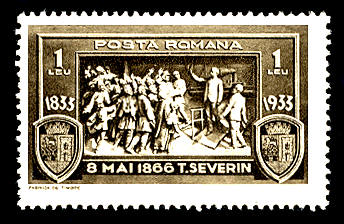
1933 stamp commemorating the entrance of King Carol I in Turnu Severin

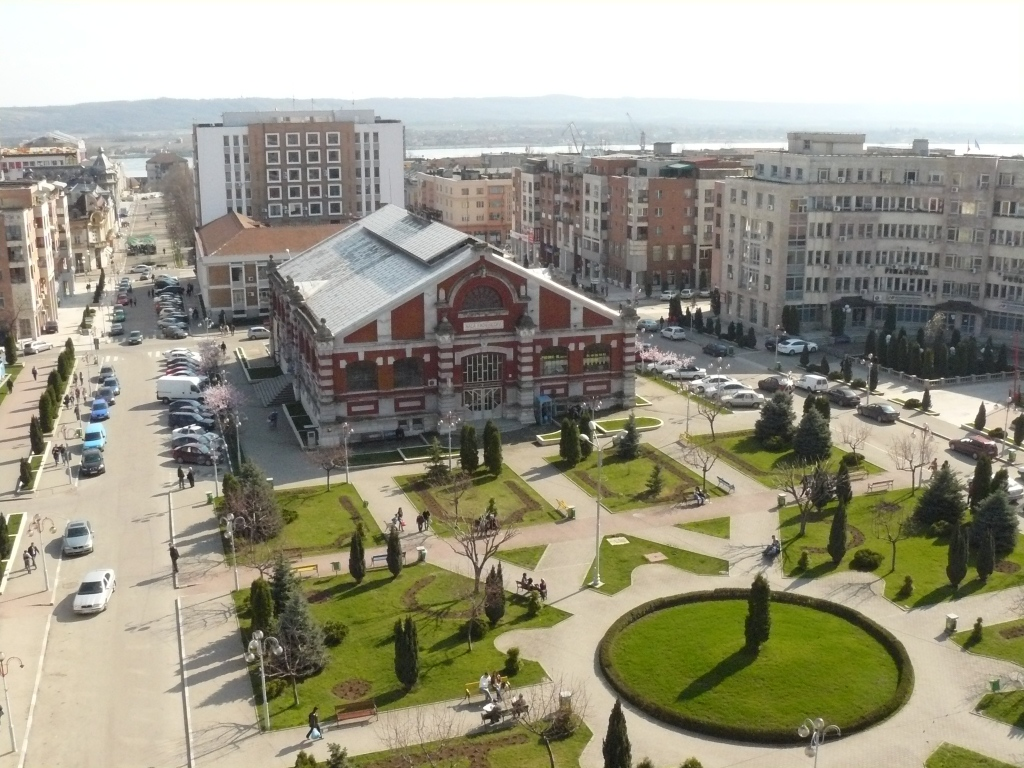
Radu Negru Hall and Park in the city center

After gaining freedom from Ottoman control as a consequence of the Treaty of Adrianople in 1829, it was decided to rebuild the present city. A rigorous program started in 1836. It was followed, in 1858, by the construction of the harbor. By 1900 the national road, rail, the Carol and Elisabeta boulevards, Navigația Fluvială Românească (River Navigation of Romania), the railway workshops, the shipyard (which in 1914 was the largest in the country), the Roman Hall, the Municipal Palace, three churches and two hospitals were built. In 1883, on May 15, Theodor Costescu established Traian High School, which in the next century would become a modern school of national prestige. The building of industrial factories spurred the development of the city. In 1841, Severin became the capital of the county and in 1851 became a city. As a major port on the Danube, the freedom of trade facilitated the entry of goods by boat from Vienna and the exchange of material necessary for economic development. Severin experienced a steady economic, urban and social growth until 1972, when it received the name of Drobeta-Turnu Severin.

In 1914, the Water Castle (Castelul de Apă) was opened. Considered an emblematic monument to the people of Severin, it gives identity to the city by being built in one of the major traffic roundabouts of the city.

The central neighborhoods were spared from the countrywide campaign of demolitions unleashed by the Ceauşescu regime, allowing the historic architecture of the city to survive. In 1968, Turnu Severin became the capital of the county, concurrently becoming a city ("municipiu"). In 1972, the name of the ancient Drobeta was added to the city's name, and it became Drobeta-Turnu Severin.

== Population (1859–2021) ==
Historical population

Year	Pop.	±% p.a.
1859	2,925	—
1899	19,753	+4.89%
1912	23,643	+1.39%
1930	21,107	−0.63%
1941	30,475	+3.40%

Year	Pop.	±% p.a.
1948	31,296	+0.38%
1956	32,486	+0.47%
1966	45,397	+3.40%
1977	76,686	+4.88%
1992	115,259	+2.75%

Year	Pop.	±% p.a.
2002	104,035	−1.02%
2011	92,617	−1.28%
2021	79,865	−1.47%

Source: Census data, 1930–1948.

== Climate ==
The region's climate gives Severin warm summers and mild winters, meaning the city is home to magnolia trees, Caucasian nut trees, and ginkgo biloba as well as the almond trees, figs, lilacs, lindens, and chestnut trees more common throughout Europe.

Climate data for Drobeta-Turnu Severin (1991–2020)
Month	Jan	Feb	Mar	Apr	May	Jun	Jul	Aug	Sep	Oct	Nov	Dec	Year
Record high °C (°F)	19.6 (67.3)	23.3 (73.9)	25.9 (78.6)	32.0 (89.6)	35.0 (95.0)	39.6 (103.3)	42.6 (108.7)	41.3 (106.3)	37.1 (98.8)	32.1 (89.8)	25.4 (77.7)	18.5 (65.3)	42.6 (108.7)
Mean daily maximum °C (°F)	4.7 (40.5)	7.5 (45.5)	13.2 (55.8)	19.2 (66.6)	24.3 (75.7)	28.5 (83.3)	31.1 (88.0)	31.2 (88.2)	25.3 (77.5)	18.4 (65.1)	11.0 (51.8)	5.4 (41.7)	18.3 (64.9)
Daily mean °C (°F)	0.6 (33.1)	2.5 (36.5)	7.1 (44.8)	12.7 (54.9)	17.9 (64.2)	22.1 (71.8)	24.2 (75.6)	24 (75)	18.5 (65.3)	12.5 (54.5)	6.7 (44.1)	1.7 (35.1)	12.5 (54.5)
Mean daily minimum °C (°F)	−2.6 (27.3)	−1.2 (29.8)	2.5 (36.5)	7.3 (45.1)	12.1 (53.8)	15.8 (60.4)	17.6 (63.7)	17.7 (63.9)	13.4 (56.1)	8.3 (46.9)	3.6 (38.5)	−1.3 (29.7)	7.8 (46.0)
Record low °C (°F)	−18.2 (−0.8)	−22.2 (−8.0)	−14.4 (6.1)	−3.0 (26.6)	2.4 (36.3)	6.4 (43.5)	9.0 (48.2)	8.6 (47.5)	1.6 (34.9)	−3.8 (25.2)	−14.4 (6.1)	−16.8 (1.8)	−22.2 (−8.0)
Average precipitation mm (inches)	46.2 (1.82)	42.7 (1.68)	42.3 (1.67)	57.1 (2.25)	69.0 (2.72)	66.6 (2.62)	66.1 (2.60)	41.1 (1.62)	55.0 (2.17)	55.4 (2.18)	54.4 (2.14)	64.0 (2.52)	659.9 (25.98)
Average precipitation days (≥ 1.0 mm)	7.3	6.3	6.4	7.4	8.0	7.4	6.0	4.5	5.8	6.0	6.9	7.5	79.5
Mean monthly sunshine hours	90.4	115.1	172.5	210.2	257.9	290.2	322.0	301.9	220.0	156.0	88.9	79.5	2,304.6
Source 1: NOAA
Source 2: Meteomanz (extremes since 2021)

== Notable natives ==
- Gheorghe D. Anghel
- Constantin Bălescu
- Ion Biberi
- Liviu Bratoloveanu
- Cristian Bușoi
- Radu Cioculescu
- Paul Dimo
- Mihai Fifor
- Șerban Foarță
- Richard Franasovici
- Ion Gigurtu
- N. I. Herescu
- Sorin Lavric
- Luis Lazarus
- Alexander Löhr
- Anghel Mora
- Alexandru Ioan Morțun
- Gheron Netta
- Virgil Ogășanu
- Sever Pleniceanu
- Virgil-Daniel Popescu
- Ștefan Protopopescu
- Mirel Rădoi
- Silvia-Raluca Sgîrcea
- Pompiliu Ștefu
- Valeriu Tița
- Gheorghe Țițeica
- Doru-Viorel Ursu
- Monica Vișan
- Alice Voinescu

== Gallery ==
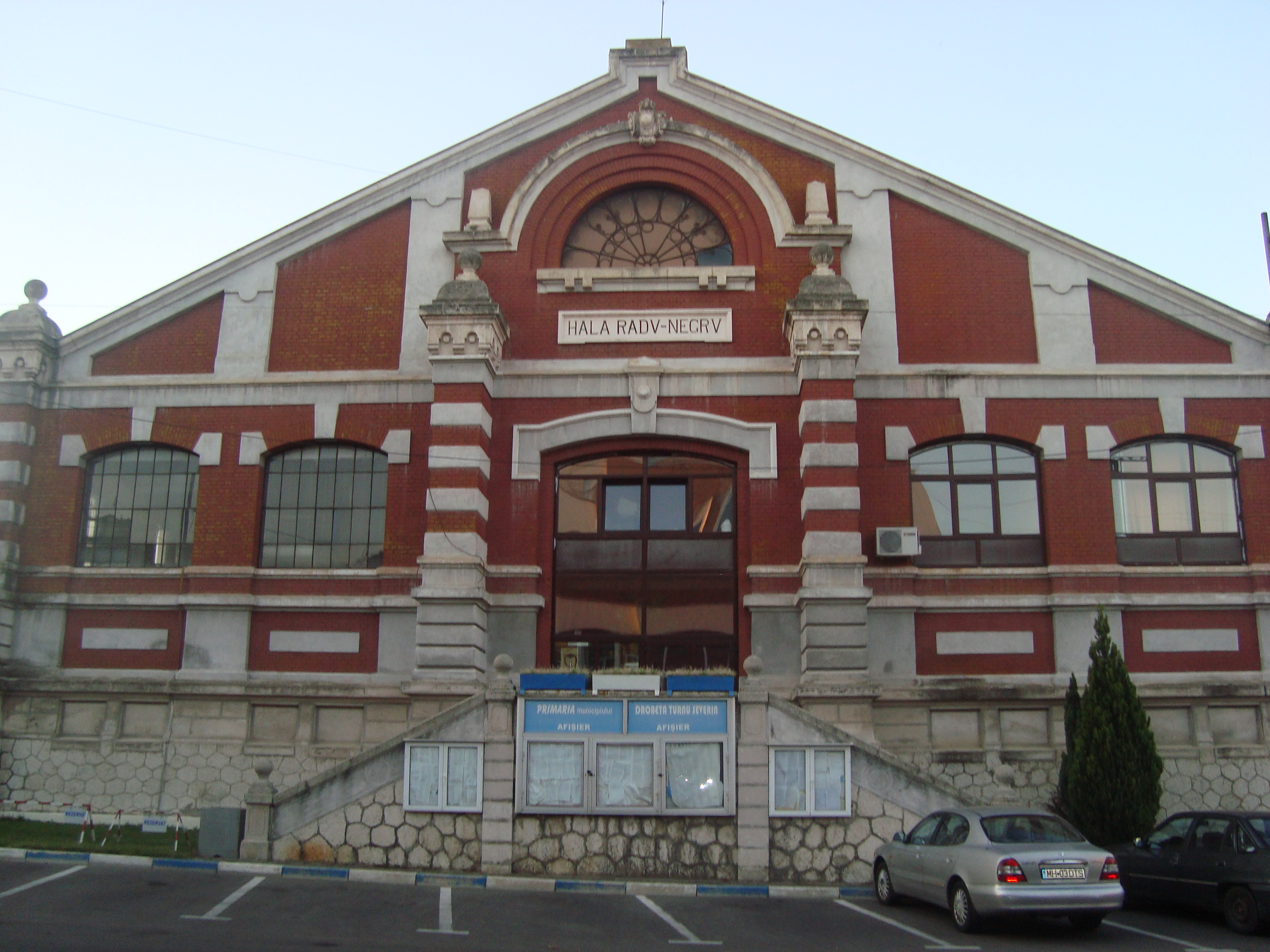
Radu Negru Hall as of 2014

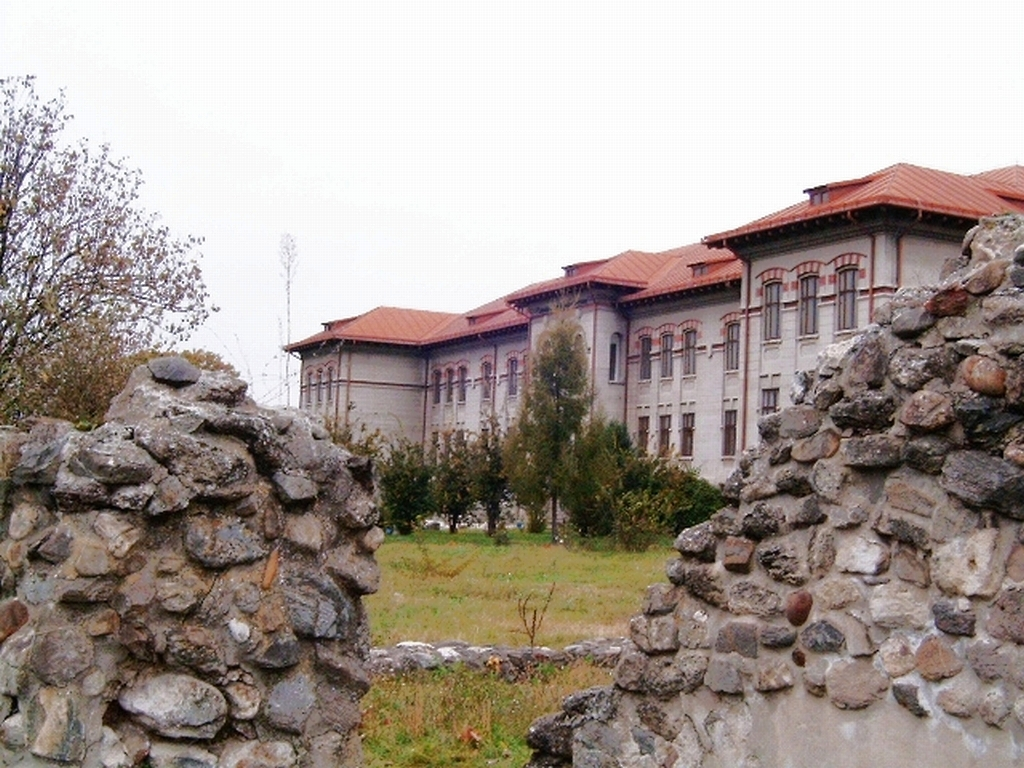
Iron Gates Region Museum behind Roman ruins

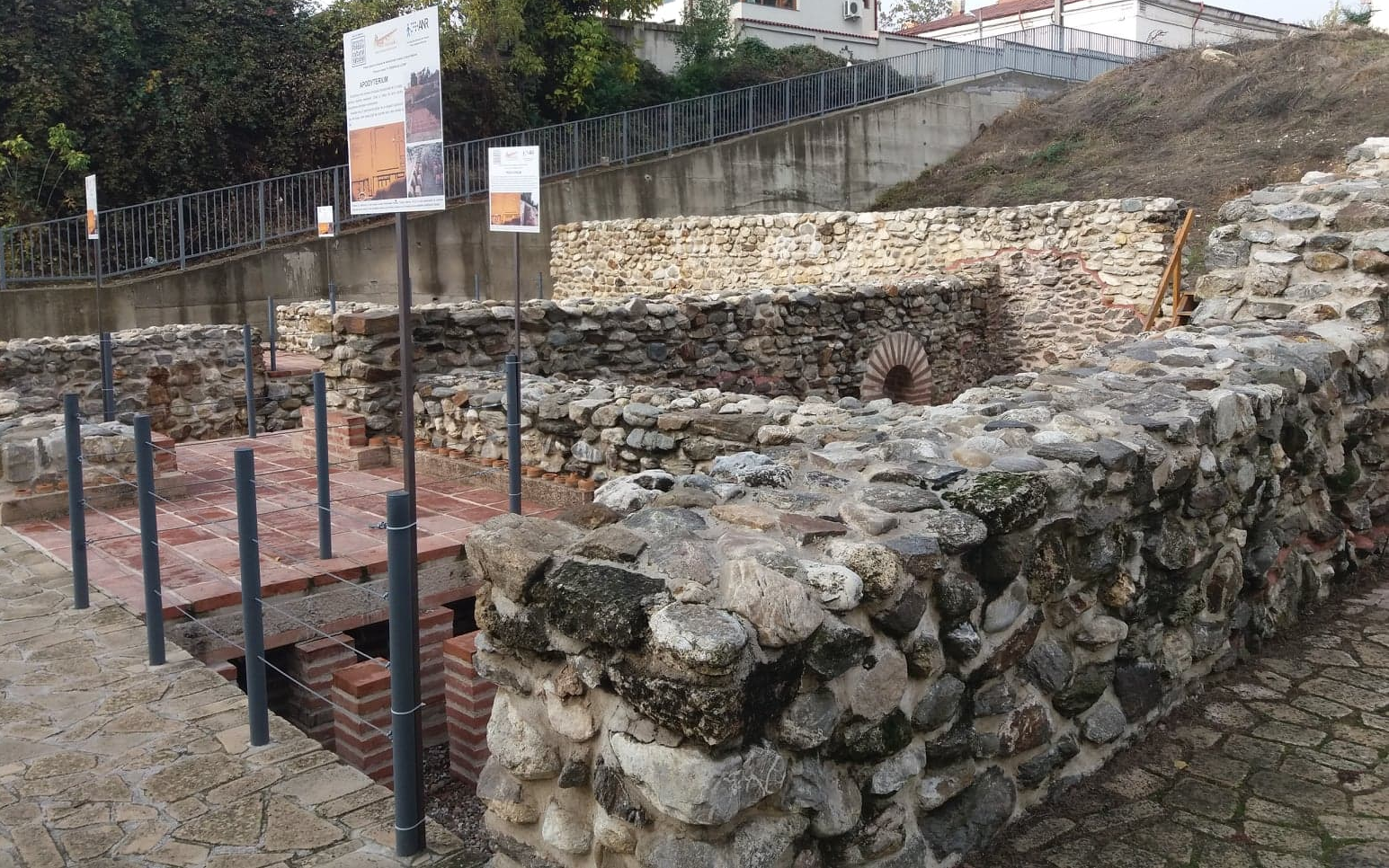
Roman thermes in Drobeta

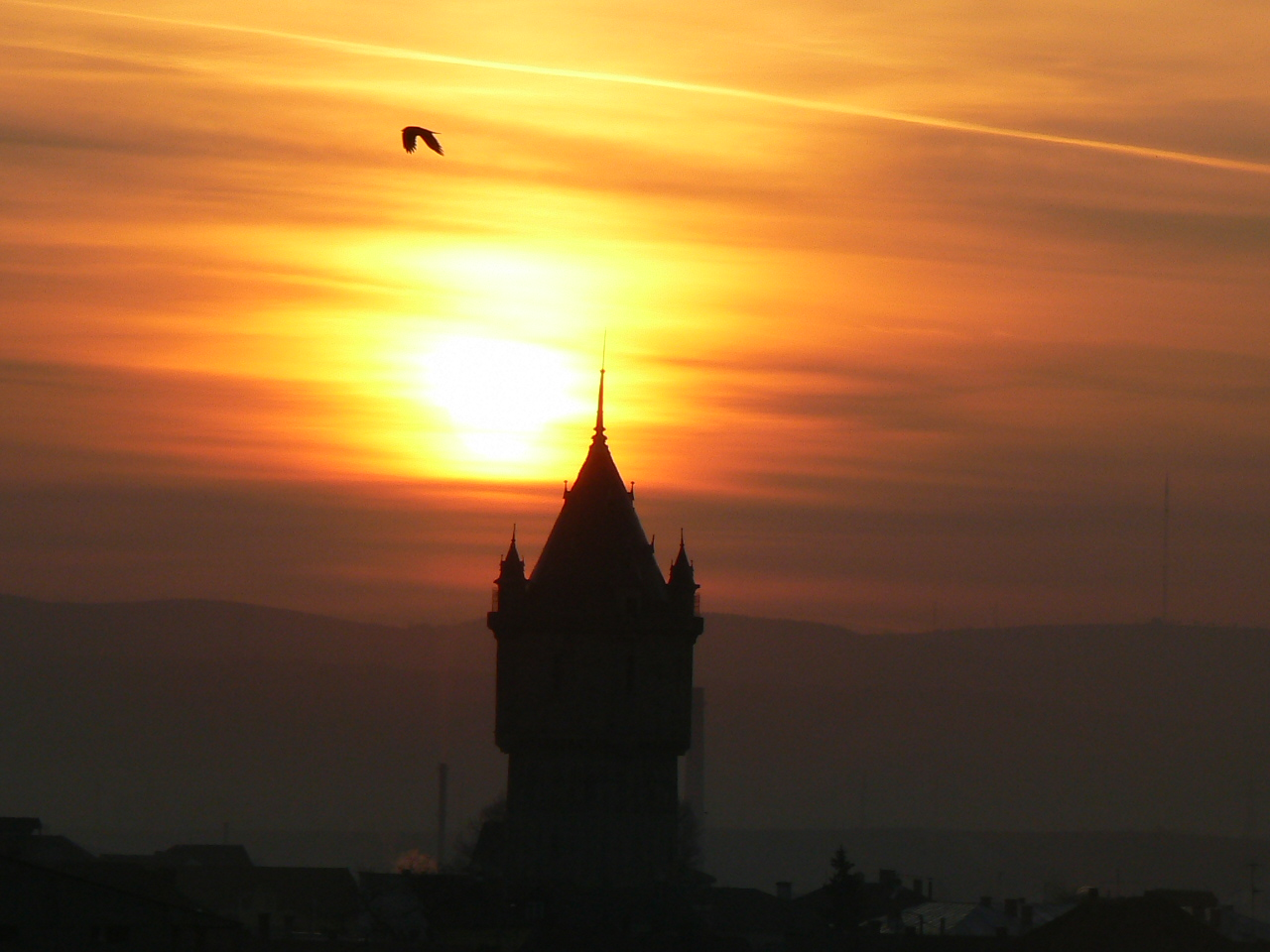
The Water Castle at sunset

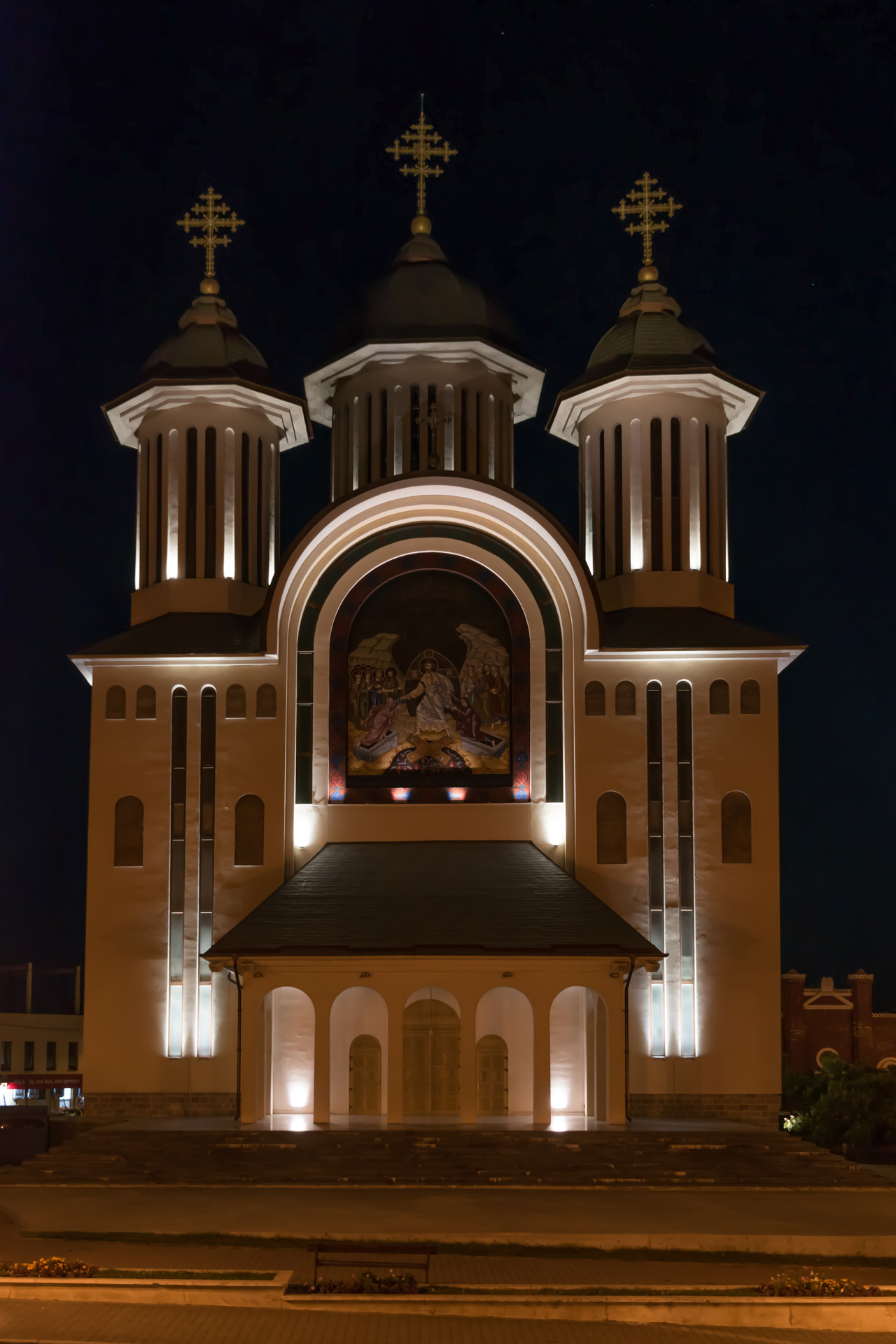
Resurrection Episcopal Cathedral

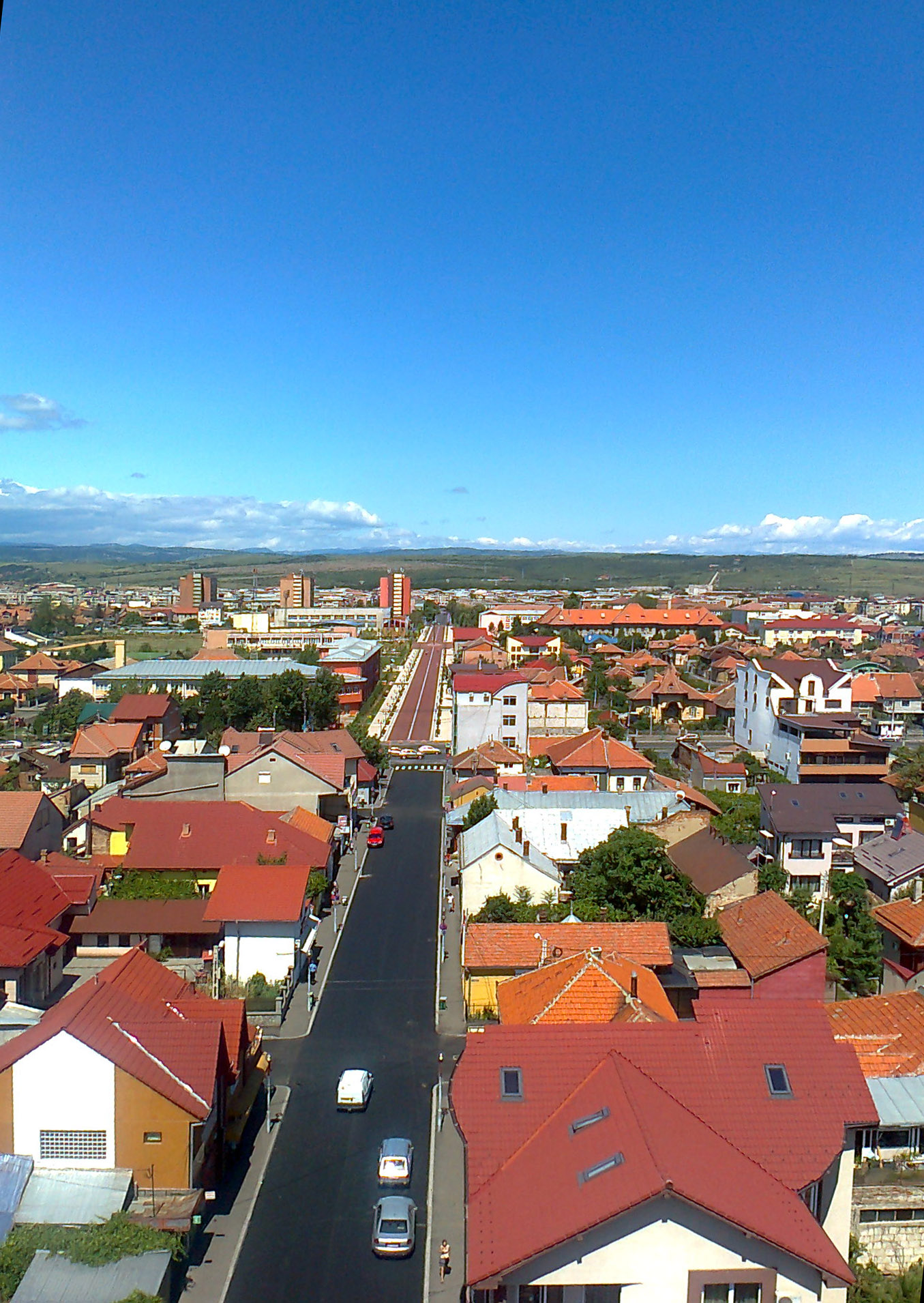
Overview of the city from top of the Water Castle

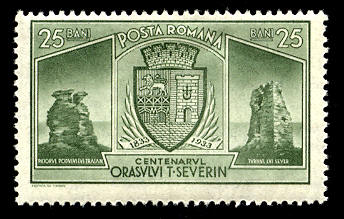
1933 stamp

== See also ==
- Iron Gates Region Museum
- Iron Gate I Hydroelectric Power Station
