= Rus'–Cuman wars =

Series of wars circa 1054–1223

Rus'–Cuman Wars
- Part of the Kievan Rus' wars
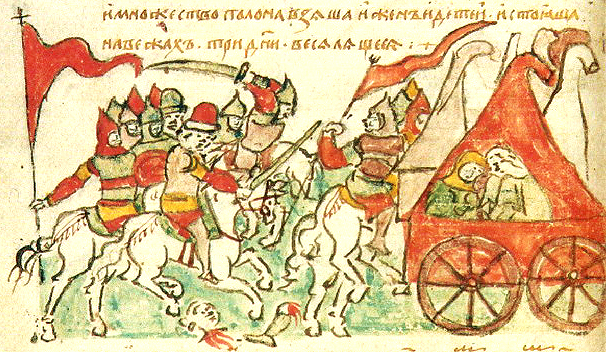
- Russian attack on the Cuman nomads. Miniature from the Radziwiłł Chronicle
Date	1054/1055/1060 – 1223/1238
Location	Mostly Southern Rus' and steppes of the northern Black Sea shores
Result	Inconclusive: Mongol conquest of both nation

Belligerents
Cuman–Kipchak confederation	Kievian Rus'

Commanders and leaders
Cuman khans: Iskal †; Sharukan; Tugorkan †; Boniak; Urusoba †; Altunopa †; Könchek; Hzak; Kobyak; Togly and others.	Rus' princes: Izyaslav Yaroslavich †; Roman Svyatoslavich †; Svyatopolk Izyaslavich; Rostislav Vsevolodovich †; Vladimir Monomakh; Svyatoslav Vsevolodovich; Roman Mstislavich; Igor Svyatoslavich and others.

Rus'–Cuman Wars was a series of military conflicts that lasted for approximately half a century between Kievian Rus' and Polovtsian tribes. They were caused by the collision of economic interests of the sedentary Eastern Slavs and the Turkic nomads of the Black Sea steppes. The conflict can be divided into two phases:

- From Cuman arrival to the Black Sea steppes in 1054/1055 to the death of Vladimir Monomakh in 1125. During this phase, Cumans would raid Rus' territories, with the Rus' eventually launching counterattack under Vladimir Monomakh and defeating Cumans.
- From the death of Vladimir Monomakh to the Mongol conquests in 1240. This phase would start with relative peace secured by the Vladimir Monomakh and Sviatopolk II of Kiev, although eventually Cumans would restart their raids and they would be greatly employed by the Rus' princes against each other in the internecine feuds amidst the dissolution of the Kievian Rus'. The Mongol conquests would put an end to the warfare between Cumans and the Rus' principalities, with them allying against the common Mongol threat.

== Background ==
Kipchaks were Turkic people that most likely lived in the Altai region within the Turkic Khaganate. In the 9th and 10th centuries, after the collapse of the khaganate, they joined the tribal union with the Yemeks and advanced into the south-western Siberia to the areas along the Irtysh, Ishim and Tobol rivers. Their westernmost areas were reaching the Ural Mountains. To the south, Kipchaks and Yemeks encroached on the grazing lands of Uzes (or Oghuzs). Within this confederacy, Kipchaks held a rather autonomous position.

Kipchaks and Cumans were originally separate peoples, with the Cumans living to the east of the Huanghe bend. Khitan people displaced them at the end of the 10th century, and Cumans reached the Kipchak territories in the middle of the 11th century. By the 12th century, Kipchaks and Cumans formed a confederacy and must have merged to the point of them becoming inseparable in the historical writings, with "Cuman" and "Kipchak" becoming interchangeable names. Russian sources use another term to refer to them: Polovtsy.

The resultant Kipchak-Cuman confederacy occupied large areas from the middle reaches of the Irtysh river to as far as the Lower Danube. However, it was never a centralized state but rather a tribal union divided into the five large tribal zones. These were ruled by independent khans who acted and interacted independently with the various neighboring states, such as Rus' principalities, Byzantine Empire, the Caucasian states and Khwarezm.

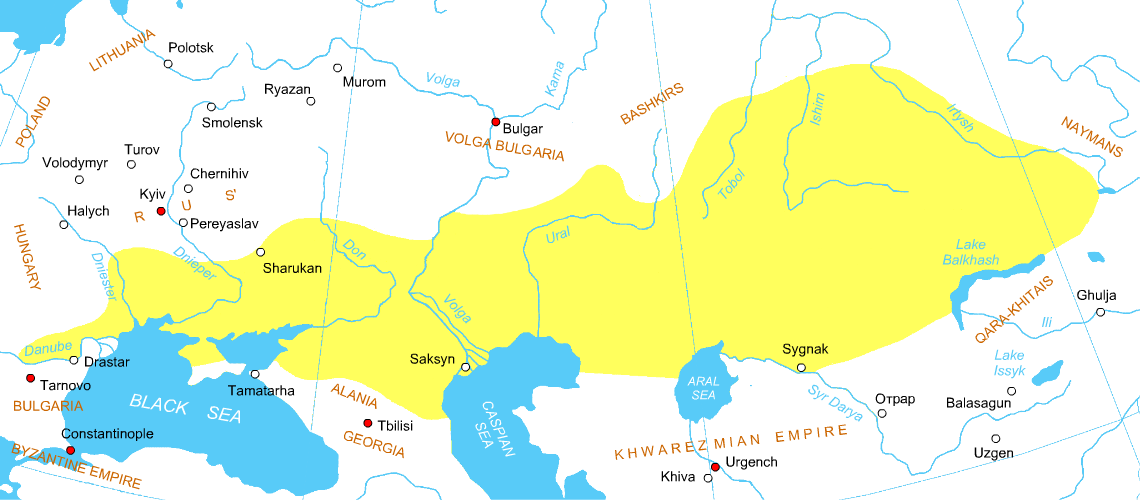
Map of Cuman–Kipchak confederation.

== Correlation between forces and military organization ==
Not much is known about the Polovtsian warriors, but their military organization was considered by contemporaries to be quite high for their time. The main strength of the nomads, as with any steppes, were detachments of light cavalry armed with bows. Polovtsian warriors, besides bows, also had sabers, javelins and spears. The warriors typically wore short-sleeved mail hauberks and lamellar cuirasses, while the elite ones also wore iron or bronze face-masks attached to their helmets. Most likely, the Polovtsian khans had their own detachments with heavy weapons. It is also known about the use of various military techniques (since the second half of the XII century) by the Polovtsians - heavy crossbows and "liquid fire", possibly borrowed from China even during their presence in the Altai region, or in later times from the Byzantines (see Greek fire).

Polovtsians used the tactics of surprise attacks. They acted mainly against poorly defended villages, but rarely attacked fortified fortresses. In the field engagement, the Polovtsian khans wisely divided their forces, used mobile detachments in the vanguard to initiate the battle, which were then assisted by the attack of the main forces. Thus, Cumans were experienced and skilled opponents.

Nevertheless, Rus' enjoyed a huge advantage over its steppe neighbors. According to historians, the population of the Rus' state in the 11th century already exceeded 5 million inhabitants, while the nomads numbered several hundred thousand. The Polovtsians' were aided by the disunity and contradictions within the camp of their Rus' opponents.

The structure of the Rus' army during the era of feudal fragmentation changed significantly compared to the earlier period. Now it consisted of three main parts: the princely druzhinas, the personal detachments of the aristocrats-boyars, and the urban militias. Rus' military art also did improve to a fairly high level.

== First phase of conflict ==
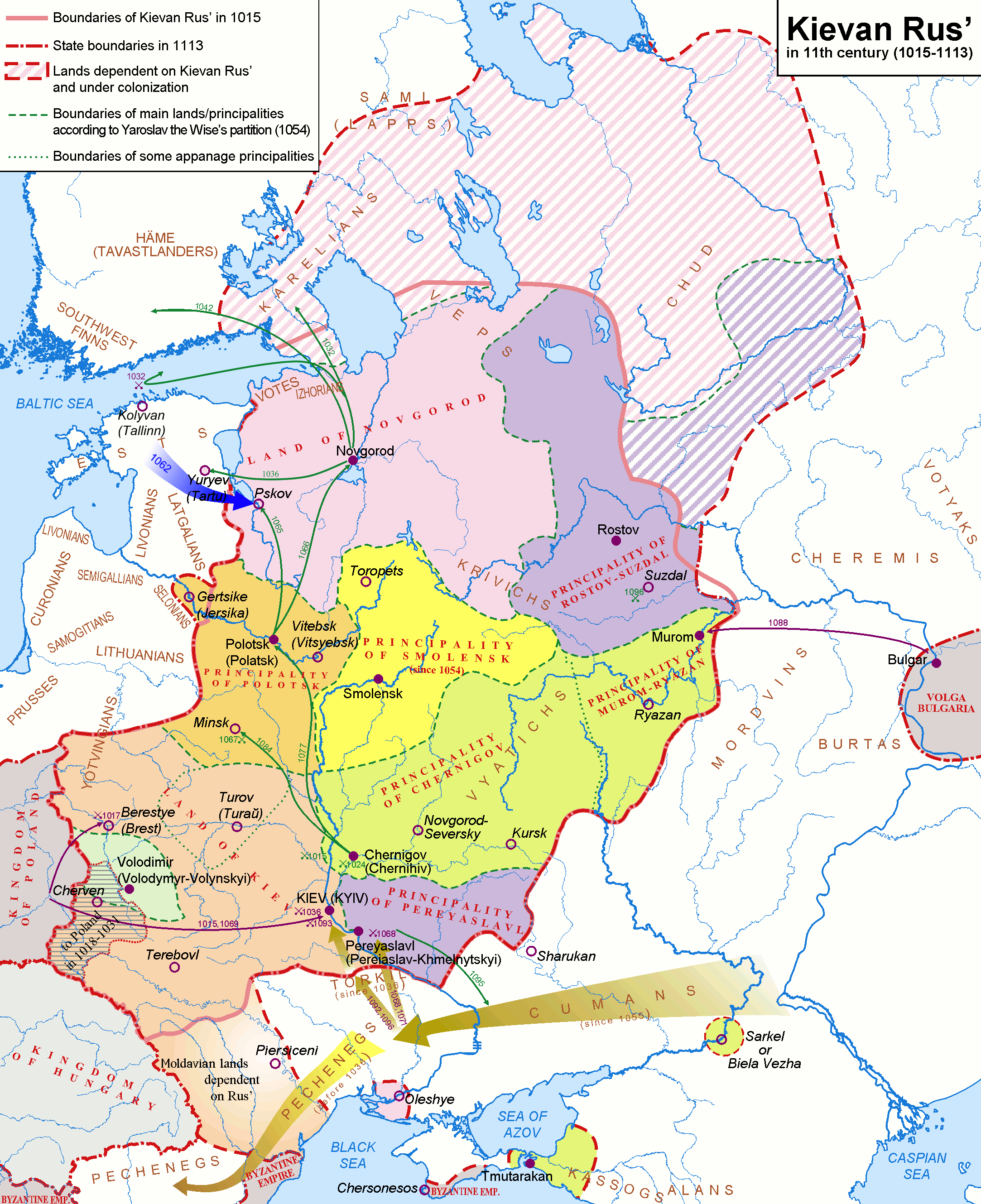
Kievan Rus in 1015.

The beginning of the first phase of the conflict can be dated to the arrival of Cumans to the Black Sea steppes in 1054/1055. At this stage, Cumans successfully raided Rus' holdings. One of the largest Polovtsian invasions of Rus' occurred in 1068. The Polovtsians were opposed by the forces of Iziaslav, Sviatoslav, and Vsevolod Yaroslavichs, the Triumvirate of Yaroslavichs, which at that time ruled all of Rus'. However, this army suffered a crushing defeat on the Alta River. Iziaslav refused to provide the horses and weapons from his arsenal to fight against the Cumans a second time, which led to him being briefly ousted in the Kiev uprising of 1068. However, Svyatoslav Yaroslavich, who was prince of Chernigov, with 3,000 soldiers, was still able to stop further advance of 12,000 Polovtsians in the Battle of the Snov river on November 1, with the Novgorod First Chronicle even reporting the capture of Cuman Khan Sharukan. Despite this, in 1094 senior prince Sviatopolk II decided to take a diplomatic route with Cumans and intermarried with the Cuman khan Tugorkan by wedding his daughter because the armed resistance against Cumans ultimately proved ineffective.

Later on, the Rus' went on counteroffensives against Cumans. This turn of events was demonstrated by the Rus' campaigns of 1103 and 1111 led by Svyatopolk of Kiev, David of Chernigov, and Vladimir of Pereyaslavl with their sons. The first campaign was launched in early spring of 1103. The campaign, along with countering the Cuman threat, also served the purpose of cooling the tensions within Rus' over udel between various Rus' princes and nobles by uniting them against the common threat. The organizers of the campaign, Vladimir Monomakh and Svyatopolk Izyaslavich, chose to conduct it in early spring due to tactical reasons: Polovtsian horses were usually the weakest after the winter, and with the stormy and snowy winter that had just ended, they had a hard time carrying armed riders. This caused the steppe cavalry to be ineffective as they lost their main advantage - high maneuverability. Moreover, in the Dnieper region which was chosen as a location of the campaign, the snow depth in winter reached at least 40 cm, causing Polovtsians to lose their ability to quickly retreat, thus the slow Polovtsian light cavalry would easily fall prey to the Rus'. The Rus' also chose early spring because in the anticipation of the fishing season, a large number of Polovtsian wintering encampments were set up in the lower reaches of the Dnieper, which would allow the Rus' to harm and loot Polovtsians as much as possible. The major battle took place at the Suten river, with the Rus' securing the victory, resulting in the death of 20 khans, including formidable ones such as Altunopa. The Rus' managed to penetrate as far as the Cuman encampments on the Donets and the Don. They captured a massive loot such as sheep, horses, camels, slaves and so on. Some Uzes and Pechenegs came over to the Rus' side following this campaign.

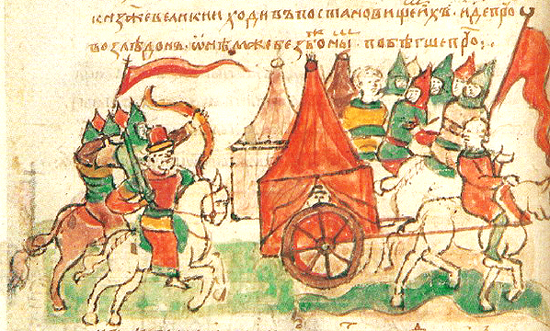
Campaign of Rus' against the Polovtsians

In 1107, Cumans suffered heavy losses during the confrontation with Rus' at Sula river, with several of their khans getting captured. In 1111, the Rus' marched to the east, crossing Sula, Psel and Vorskla. They captured several towns on Don and crossed this river too, finally engaging with the Cumans at Salnitsa river, securing another massive victory. In 1116, Vladimir mandated his son Yaropolk to lead the expedition further into the steppes, with him successfully taking several towns and returning home with an Alanian princess.

The consequences of these campaigns were significant, with many formidable Cuman khans completely disappearing from the historical records while the Rus' putting an end to the Cuman raids for half a century. Another result of these campaigns was that Uzes, Pechenegs and various other Turkic tribes by large transferred their allegiance to the Rus' and resettled from the steppes to the Rus' territories. Soon these Turkic tribes were reconstituted into the new Turkic federation called Black Klobuks. Large marches of Rus' were occupied by Black Klobuks and they served as protectors of the Rus' territories from the Cumans. The Rus' themselves did not expand territorially as a result of their offensives against Cumans, they only managed to consolidate their frontiers and restore devastated settlements like Ros, Sula and Yuriev. However, they did not manage to recover some lands like Tmutarakan. Cumans, on the other hand, were driven further south near the Black Sea coasts, to Crimea, steppes of Kuban and Kuma and the Caucasus.

== Second phase of the conflict ==
The second phase of the conflict was characterized by the larger clashes between the Rus' and Cumans. At this stage, Cumans would form short-lived alliances with Russian princess and intervene into their internecine feuds over succession, most notably for the Kievian throne. The Cumans first became involved in the internecine Rus' wars back in the 1070s, namely in a conflict between Vseslav of Polotsk and Vladimir Monomakh. The major discord in the Rus' territories began with the death of Vladimir Monomakh in 1125 and lasted until in 1154 Yuri ascended to the Kievian throne with the Cuman help, restoring the traditional order of succession. By the late 1160s the Cumans not only relaunched their raids, but also greatly intensified them. Lukomorskie Cumans under the leadership of Khan Kobyak pillaged the Pereiaslavl and the River Ros region south of Kiev from the mouth of the Dniepr river and from along the shores of Black and Azov seas, while the Cuman tribes from the Donets and Don basins pillaged Olgovichi domains in the Zadesenye and Posemye regions. The increasing number of raids led to Rus' principalities under the Mstislav II of Kiev launching a joint expedition against Cumans, managing to defeat them and free the Christian captives. However, after death of Rostislav I of Kiev the Rus' was beset by even larger internal conflict. In 1169, with the Cuman help, the coalition of Grand Prince of Vladimir Andrey Bogolyubsky, sons of the late Rostislav, princes of Chernigov and others ousted Mstislav II of Kiev, cutting short his brief seizure of power. Then in 1184 Chernigovian princes allied with the Cuman khan of Donets-Don region Könchek against the princes of Kiev and Suzdal' but were defeated, resulting in the death of Könchek's brother Eltut. Despite these alliances with Cumans, they were usually short-lived and Rus' princes would also unite to lead campaigns against Cumans, as such, in 1184, the joint forces of the southern Rus' princes under the leadership of the Sviatoslav III of Kiev marched against the Cumans and made them suffer a devastating defeat at the Oril river. The Rus' captivated thousands of Cumans and 16 khans including Osoluk Burchevich, Kobyak and others. Könchek counterattacked in 1185, but the conflict ended with the negotiations. In 1185, Igor Svyatoslavich of Novgorod-Seversk launched his own campaign with other Rus' princes and marched against Cumans of the upper reaches of Donets since these tribes posed the greatest threat to the Seversk towns in the Posemye. However, this campaign resulted in the catastrophic defeat for the Rus' princes at the Kayala river, with Igor and other princes being captured. This campaign was thoroughly described in the poem The Tale of Igor's Campaign. However, after this campaign, the Cuman khans split, with khan Koza preferring to raid defenceless towns of Seversk, while khan Könchek preferring to invade Kievian holdings to avenge for their victory over Kobyak, possibly because his daughter was married to Igor's son. Könchek failed to launch a full-scale invasion of Kiev, but would go on to launch raids against Sviatoslav and Rurik Rostislavich, while Koza and his allies would increase their incursions into the Chernigov lands.

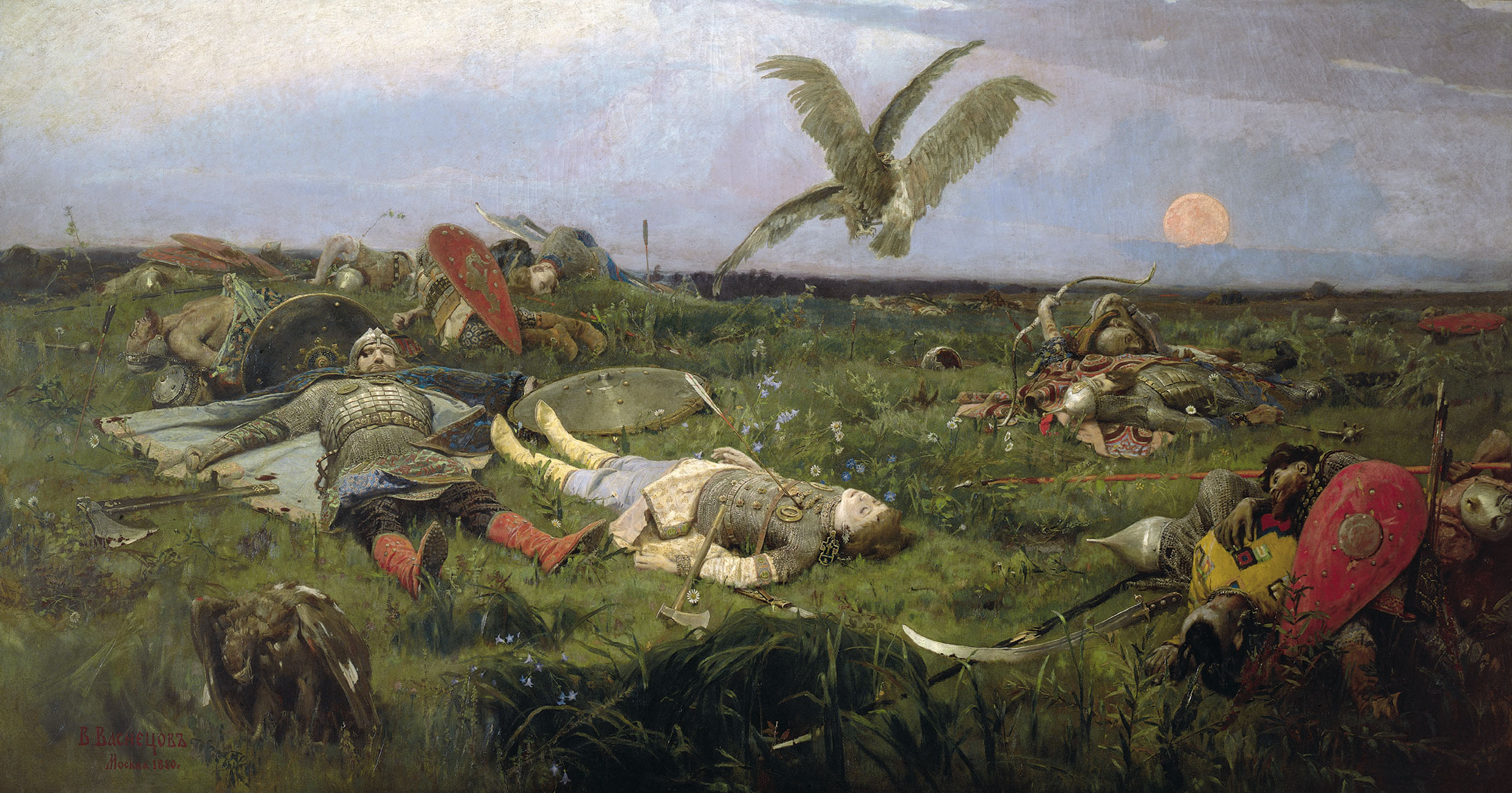
Painting by Viktor Vasnetsov "After the Battle of Igor Svyatoslavich with the Polovtsians", 1880

With neither side managing to gain upper hand, Rurik concluded a peace with Lukomorskie Cumans and argued for negotiating it with other Cuman tribes too, especially Burchevichi. Although Könchek and Koza were not invited to negotiations by Sviatoslav, Osoluk and Izay of the Burchevichi were present, which probably were considered as the most troublesome opponents east of the Dniepr by Sviatoslav, while he did not commit to concluding peace with the tribes against which mainly Igor waged wars. Nevertheless, Osoluk and Izay refused the peace offer, and Sviatoslav died without making much progress in the negotiations. After his death, Rurik Rostislavich was preoccupied with securing succession to Kievian throne to Rostislavichi over Olgovichi. However, when in 1199 Roman Mstislavich of Vladimir began attacking domains of other princes, Ryurik summoned Olgovichi who were princes of Chernigov, but in 1201 Roman evicted Ryurik from Kiev and installed his cousin Ingvar. Ryurik allied with Cumans in 1203, they sacked Kiev and massacred the population for opening the gates to Roman. Two khans, Könchek and Daniil Kobyakovich participated in this campaign.

In 1204, Svyatoslavich of Chernigov died and was succeeded by his brother Vsevolod, who in 1207 gathered his brothers, nephews and princes of Turov and Pinsk, allied with the Cumans and launched a campaign to unseat Ryurik from his throne in Kiev. Ryurik was forced to flee after Kievians again opened the gates, transferring the power to Olgovichi. However, the city would change hands several more times, with each side employing Cumans against each other. Finally, in 1208 Ryurik died and Vsevolod became the uncontested prince of Kiev.

== Arrival of Mongols ==
The arrival of Mongols changed situation drastically in the region. Cuman Khan Köten now sought an alliance with the Rus' against the Mongols and, being the father-in-law of Mstislav Mstislavich, arrived to Galich with gifts to persuade the Rus' princes to ally with Cumans against the Mongols. Mstislav III of Kiev summoned all princes and they agreed on a joint effort against the Mongols. However, some principalities, such as Vladimir-Suzdal, Riazan, Polotsk and Novgorod, sent no aid. The Rus' princes marched against the Mongols and were joined by the Cumans. The Mongols sent envoys to Rus', attempting to persuade them not to fight against the Mongols but instead to ally against Cumans, but in no avail. Cuman khans and Rus' princes were bound by intermarriage and trans-steppe trade which benefited them both. The Rus' and Cumans stayed in alliance, however, Mstislav Mstislavich and Mstislav III of Kiev fell out on their way, which weakened their forces.

In the battle of the Kalka River, the Rus' and Cumans suffered a devastating defeat. After this, Cumans never managed to regain their strength. No more raids were conducted by them against the Rus', although they were again involved in the affairs of the Rus' princes as their allies, for example, in 1225, 1228 and 1235, but the Mongols successfully renewed their efforts against Cumans in 1229-1230 and in 1237 they invaded the Rus'. Some Cumans, such as khan Köten, fled to Hungary in 1238-1239, but most were integrated into the Mongol Empire, eventually Turkicizing the Golden Horde.

== See also ==
- Mongol invasion of Kievan Rus'

== Sources ==
- Gumilev L. N., Ancient Rus' and the Great Steppe, Moscow: AST Publishing House LLC, 2002.
- Tamim, Elmetwali (2011). Cumans and Russians (1055-1240) (PDF). Egypt: Alexandria University.
- Ankov, A. A. (2016). "О причинах похода русских князей на половцев в 1103 году" [On the causes of the campaign of Rus' Princes against Cumans in the year of 1103]. Scientific works of the Moscow Humanitarian University (in Russian) (4): 56–71. doi:10.17805/trudy.2016.4.5.
- Paliy, Oleksandr (2017). Історія України [A History of Ukraine] (in Ukrainian). Kyiv: К.І.С. ISBN 978-617-684-166-1.
