= Battle of the Sula river =

1107 battle between Kievan Rus' and Cumans

- Part of the Rus'–Cuman wars
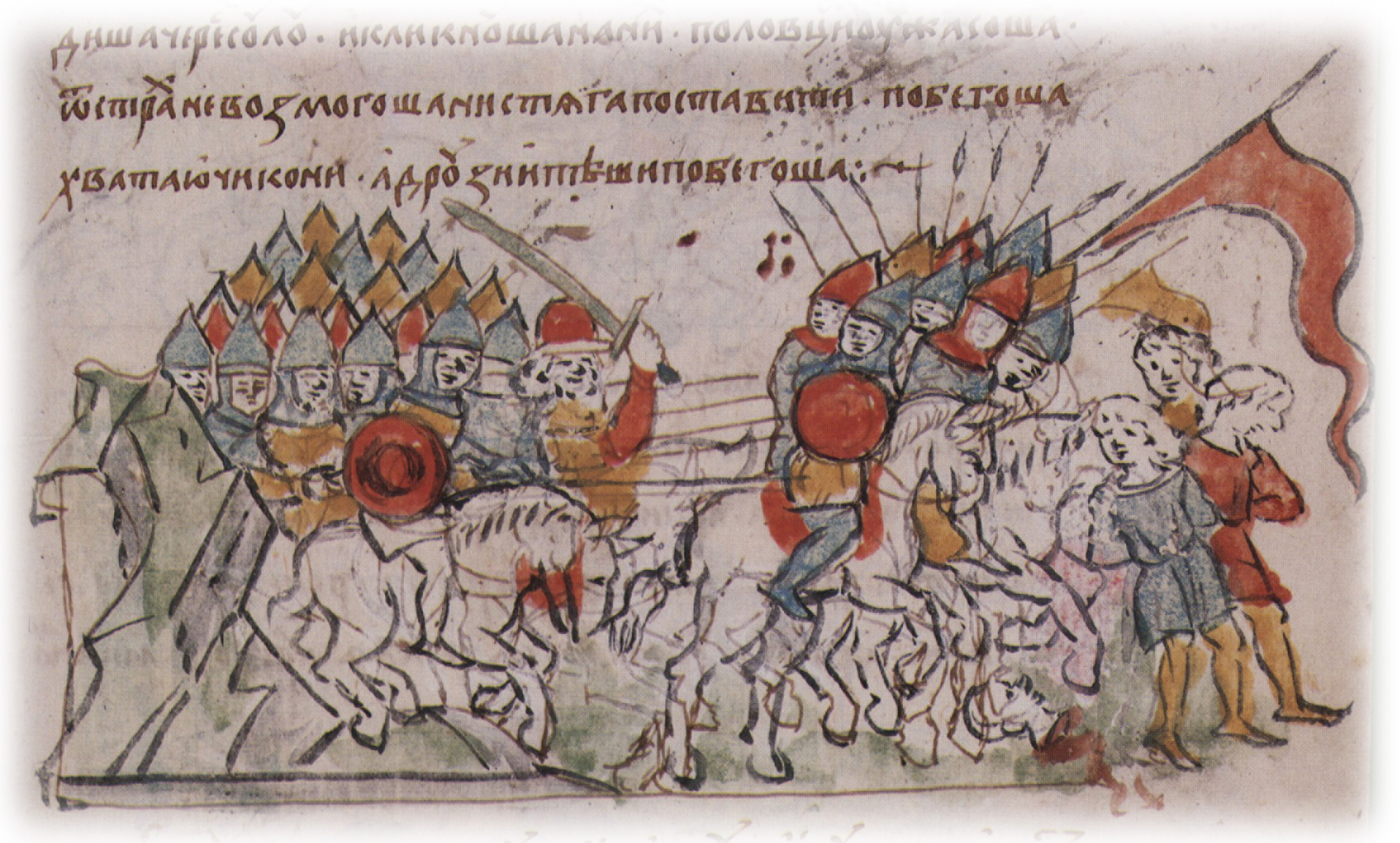
- Battle of Sula (miniature from Radziwiłł Chronicle)
Date	12 August 1107
Location	Sula river, near Lubny, Kievan Rus' (present-day Poltava Oblast, Ukraine)
Result	Rus' victory

Belligerents
Kievan Rus'	Cuman–Kipchak Confederation

Commanders and leaders
Sviatopolk II of Kiev; Oleg I of Chernigov; Vladimir II Monomakh	Boniak; Sharukan; Taz †; Sugr (POW)

Strength
Few thousand	Unknown; large

Casualties and losses
Light	Heavy

The Battle of the Sula river took place between the Rus' armies of princes Sviatopolk II of Kiev, Oleg I of Chernigov and Vladimir II Monomakh against the Cuman army of chieftain Boniak. It occurred on 12 August 1107, resulting in victory for the Rus', and the capture of several Cuman khans.

== Prelude ==
During the reign of prince Sviatopolk II of Kiev, Kievan Rus' made major progress in a struggle against the Cumans, launching frequent offensives into Cumania. In 1103, Rus' princes defeated Cuman forces at Molochna, near Khortytsia (present-day Zaporizhzhia oblast). However, this victory did not end the Cuman raids. Cuman chieftain Boniak continued his attacks on the Pereyaslav principality, leading up to another major confrontation between Cumans and Rus' princes in 1107.

== Battle ==
During the Cuman raid on the Principality of Pereyaslav, the Rus' princes Sviatopolk II of Kiev, Oleg I of Chernigov and Vladimir II Monomakh assembled an army of at least few thousand men, largely cavalrymen, in order to confront the Cuman intruders. The exact size of the Cuman army is unknown, but is believed to have been large.

The battle began on 12 August, near Lubny, after Rus' forces crossed the Sula river, with Rus' troops calling out to Cumans and taking them by surprise. Cumans were too shocked to be able to organise an efficient resistance and instead begun a chaotic retreat, with many fleeing on foot and abandoning their caravan with loot in the process. The Cumans were pursued by Rus' cavalry all the way to Khorol river, located 40–50km from Sula, leading to heavy losses among Cumans, as they, together with their leaders, were getting mauled by Rus' cavalry.

== Aftermath ==
The battle resulted in Rus' victory. The losses among Rus' forces were light, while the Cumans suffered heavy losses, as their khan Taz was killed and their khan Sugr was captured alongside his brothers. However, Cuman chieftains Boniak and Sharukan managed to escape. In 1110, Cumans again launched an attack on the Principality of Pereyaslav, but were repulsed. In 1111, Cumans would suffer another heavy defeat against the Rus' princes at the Battle of the Salnitsa river.
