= Battle of the Stuhna River =

1093 battle between Kievan Rus' and Cumans

- Part of the Rus'–Cuman wars
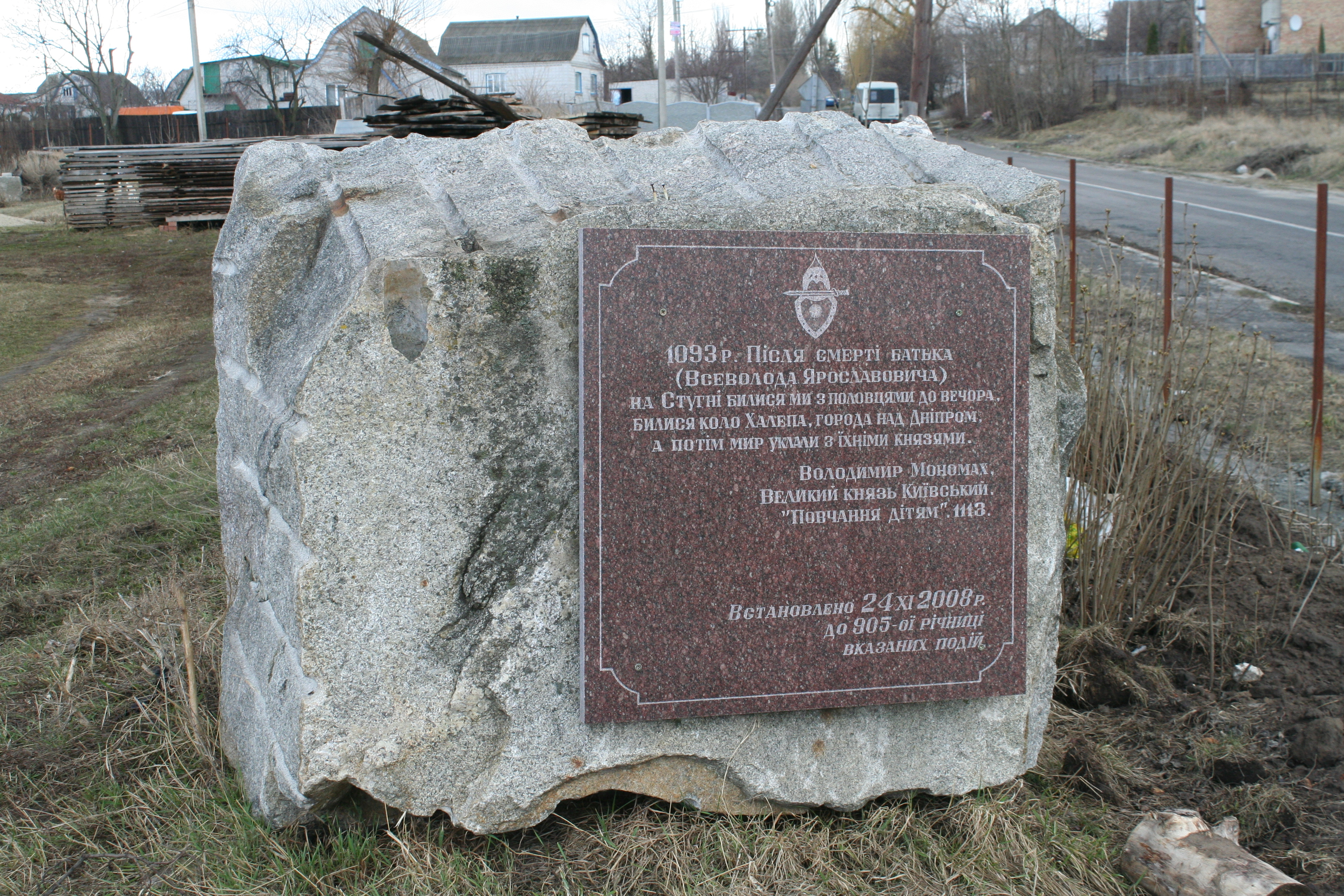
- Memorial stone commemorating the battle
Date	26 May 1093
Location	Stuhna near Trypillia
Result	Cuman victory

Belligerents
Kievan Rus': Chernigov; Pereyaslavl; Smolensk; Polotsk; Ryazan; Galicia	Cuman–Kipchak Confederation

Commanders and leaders
Sviatopolk II; Vladimir II Monomakh; Rostislav Vsevolodovich †	Tugorkan

Strength
Unknown	Unknown

Casualties and losses
5,000 killed	Unknown

The Battle of the Stuhna River (sometimes written as Stugna River; on 26 May 1093) was fought between the princes of Kievan Rus', Sviatopolk II of Kiev, Vladimir II Monomakh of Chernigov, and Rostislav Vsevolodovich of Pereyaslavl against the nomadic Cumans. The Kievan forces were defeated.

== Background ==
The Cumans raided Rus' soon after the death of Vsevolod and sought peace with the new great prince, Sviatopolk. However, Sviatopolk incarcerated the Cumans' ambassadors, and the Cumans came in force to attack Kiev. Facing an enemy army of eight thousand, Sviatopolk took the advice of counsel and called for help from Vladimir Monomakh, prince of Chernigov. Vladimir came with his troops and also called upon his only brother, Rostislav of Pereyaslavl.

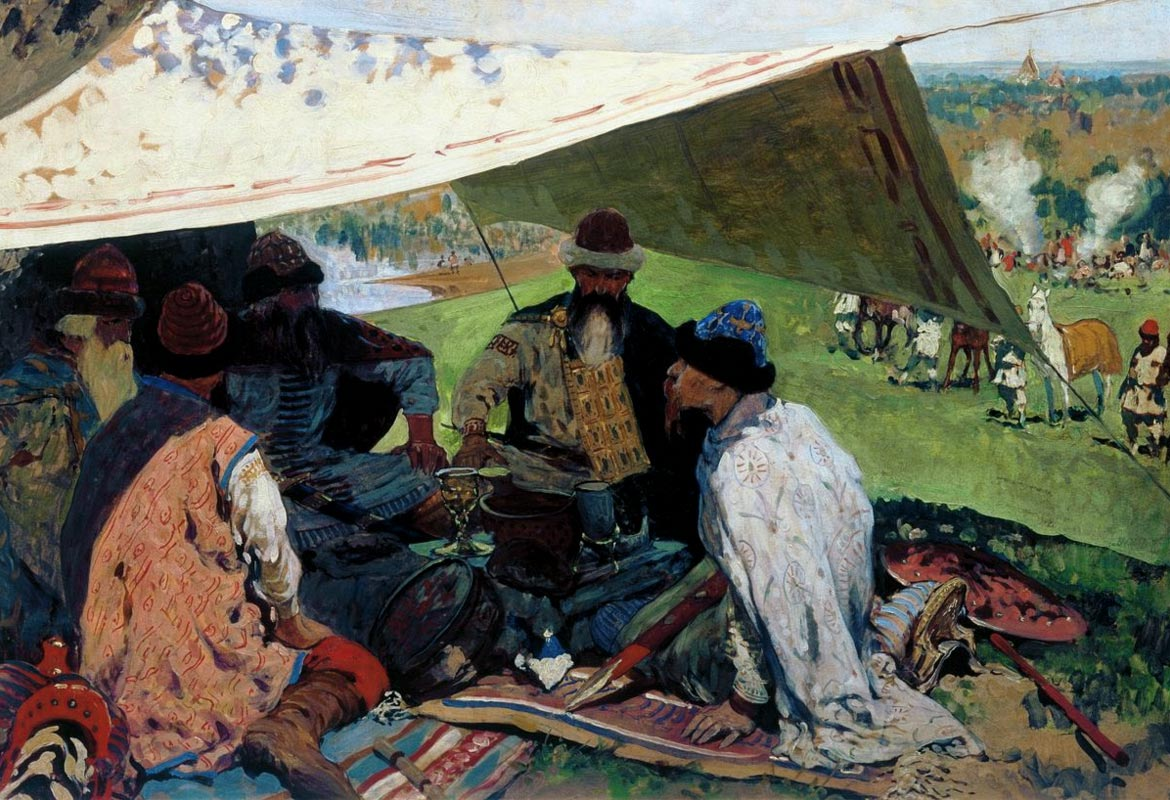
Princes of Rus' deliberate their actions against the Cumans. 1910 painting

== Battle ==
A union of Kievan princes against Cumans was achieved, and Sviatopolk released the ambassadors of the Cumans. The troops of the three princes joined and set out for the city of Trypillia. Approaching the river Stuhna, the princes were undecided, so they stopped to have a council, while the Cumans were across the river facing them. Vladimir, whose wife was a Cuman princess, continued to demand that they sue for peace, but the Kievan troops wanted battle. They crossed the river and met the Cumans in a valley at the rampart of Trepol'. Sviatopolk deployed on the right, Rostislav in the center, and Vladimir on the left.

As the Kievan troops reached the rampart, the Cumans bowmen attacked Sviatopolk's men, and after a bloody engagement his troops broke. Sviatopolk attempted to make a stand, but the impact of his retreating men carried him back. Then Vladimir's force was attacked and after a fierce confrontation all the Kievan troops were in retreat. Sviatopolk took cover in Trepol', but Rostislav and Vladimir attempted to swim the Stuhna River. Rostislav, in heavy chain armour, drowned. Vladimir retreated to Chernigov and Sviatopolk retreated at night to Kiev.

The Kyiv Caves Patericon ascribed Rostislav's death to his own haughtiness. It is said that he refused to enter the church and pray for the battle's outcome. The young prince's death is also recalled in the Tale of Igor's Campaign:

Not like that is the river Stuhna - endowed with a meager stream, having fed therefore on other rills and runners, she rent between bushes a youth, prince Rostislav, imprisoning him. On the Dnieper's dark bank Rostislav's mother weeps for the youth. Pined away have the flowers with condolement, and the tree has been bent to the ground with sorrow.

== See also ==
- Cumania
- Battle of the Kalka River
- Koten
