= Council of Piacenza =

Roman Catholic synod in March 1095

The Council of Piacenza was a mixed synod of ecclesiastics and laymen of the Roman Catholic Church, which took place from March 1 to March 7, 1095, at Piacenza.

The Council was held at the end of Pope Urban II's tour of Italy and France, which he made to reassert his authority after the investiture controversy with Henry IV, Holy Roman Emperor. Two hundred bishops attended, as well as 4000 other church officials, and 30,000 laymen. The large number of people present required that the council had to be held outside of the city.

== Attendants ==
Among the lay attendees was Eupraxia of Kiev, a daughter of Vsevolod I, Prince of Kiev. She met with Urban II, and on his urgings Eupraxia made a public confession before the church council. Henry, she claimed, held her against her will, forced her into orgies, offered her to his son Conrad, and attempted to use her in a black mass. These accusations were confirmed in turn by Conrad, who stated that this was the reason he turned against his father.

Also in attendance were ambassadors from Philip I of France, who came to appeal Philip's recent excommunication at the synod of Autun over his illegal divorce and remarriage to Bertrade de Montfort: Philip was given until Pentecost to rectify his situation, but his excommunication was repeated at the Council of Clermont. The rest of the business of the council expressed fairly typical church concerns: there were at least 15 canons published during the council, including condemnations of the Berengarian; and Nicolaitan heresies; an affirmation of transubstantiation, that is, the physical presence of Christ in the Eucharist; denunciations of the Antipope Clement III and his supporters; and a prohibition of payment to priests for baptisms, burials, or confirmations.

== Condemnation of simony ==
One of Urban II's greatest achievements at Piacenza was the depth of detail of his Canons, in particular Canons 1 through 7 legislating universal condemnation of 'simony': the practice of building to acquire, and acquiring via purchasing, position, or ordination, within the Church. Ecclesiastical appointments stained by simony were decreed to be invalid and powerless. However, a temperate attitude was shown to those ordained by simoniacs who were not simoniacs themselves, and had no prior knowledge that the person ordaining them had no actual ecclesiastical authority to do so. Likewise, churches purchased by parents for their children were allowed to remain within the order; as were children so-ordained, but with benefices (official financial support from Rome) removed.

== Byzantine request ==
In hindsight, the most important attendees were the ambassadors sent by Byzantine emperor Alexius I Komnenos. Alexius had been excommunicated by Gregory VII, and been through a series of reinstatements in the Church, but Urban had ultimately lifted the excommunication when he became pope in 1088, and relations between the East and West were at least temporarily friendly. The Byzantine Empire had lost much of its territory in Asia Minor to the Seljuk Turks in the aftermath of the Battle of Manzikert in 1071, and Alexius hoped Western knights could help him restore it. Upon hearing the Byzantine ambassadors' plea, Urban asked those present to lend aid to the Byzantine Emperor. However it is likely that Urban may have had some idea of an expedition to the East before Alexius's request, as Gregory VII had also called twice for one, but to no avail.

== Chronicler ==
Most of the information about the Council of Piacenza comes from the chronicler Bernold of Constance, who may or may not have been present. No extant contemporary Byzantine sources felt the ambassadors were important enough to mention, although many Byzantine sources from this time no longer exist. For example, the council is mentioned by the 13th century chronicler Theodore Skoutariotes, who quotes now-lost contemporary works.
