= Aqköbik Khan =

Aqköbik Khan was the leader of the Toksaba tribe of the Kipchaks who lived in the 13th century. The conflict between him and Köten Khan, the leader of the Durut tribe, is described in historical sources. He is considered an ancestor of the Kazakh Kipchaks.

== Life ==
According to legend, Köten Khan’s son, Mangush, encountered Aqköbik Khan during a hunting trip and was killed by him. This incident intensified the long-standing rivalry between the two tribes, prompting Köten Khan to declare war on the Toksaba tribe. As a result, Aqköbik Khan was wounded, and his army was defeated. Following the defeat, Aqqobik Khan’s brother, Ansar (or Unsar), went to Batu Khan, the prince of the Thousand, to request help against the Durut tribe. Batu Khan accepted the request and launched a campaign against the Duruts, resulting in many of them being killed and the rest taken prisoner.

The life and actions of Aqköbik Khan reflect the complexity of the internal political relations among the Kipchak tribes and their interactions with the Mongols. These events provide valuable insight into the ethno-political situation of the Eurasian steppe in the 13th century.

The Kipchaks who are part of the Kazakh nation today trace their ancestry to Aqqobik Khan and the Toksaba tribe. One piece of evidence for this is the fact that the battle cry (war slogan) of the "Kara Kipchaks" is “Toksaba.”

== See also ==
- Köten
- Batu Khan
