= Anna Polovetskaya =

Grand Princess consort of Kiev
- Tenure: 1078 – 1093
- Died: 1111
- Spouse: Vsevolod I of Kiev (m. 1068; died 1093)
- Issue: Rostislav Vsevolodovich; Eupraxia, Holy Roman Empress; Catherine Vsevolodovna; Maria Vsevolodovna
- Dynasty: Rurik (by marriage)

Anna Polovetskaya (Note: Russian: Анна Половецкая; Ukrainian: Анна Половчанка, romanized: Anna Polovchanka) (died 1111) was the grand princess consort of Kiev during her marriage to Vsevolod I.

== Life ==
A daughter of a Cuman khan, she married Vsevolod I in 1068. In connection to the wedding, she converted from her original faith, Tengrism, to Christianity, and was given the name Anna.

When she was widowed in 1093, she stayed in Kiev.

In 1097, her stepson Vladimir Monomakh besieged Sviatoslav Iziaslavych in Kiev. Anna, together with Nicholas, Metropolitan of Kiev and all Rus', were chosen to act as mediators. She managed to stop the siege and secure peace by addressing her stepson with the following words:

молимсѧ кнѧже тобѣ и братома твоима . не мозѣте погубити Русьскои землѣ . аще бо возметь рать межю собою . погани имуть радоватисѧ . и возмуть землю нашю . юже бѣша стѧжали ваши дѣди . ї ѡц҃и ваши . трудомъ великимъ и хороборьствомъ . побарѧюще по Русьскои земли . а ины земли приискаху . а вы хощете погубити Русьскую землю

We ask you, prince, and both your brothers: do not destroy the Rus' land. For if you raise your army among yourselves, the pagans will rejoice and take our land, which was gathered by your grandfathers and your fathers through great labour and courage, fighting for the Rus' land, and they obtained other lands. And you want to destroy the Rus' land.

— Primary Chronicle

== Children ==
- Rostislav Vsevolodovich (1070 – 26 May 1093). Drowned while retreating from the Battle of the Stugna River.
- Eupraxia, Holy Roman Empress (1071 – 20 July 1109). First married Henry the Long, Margrave of Nordarm, next in 1089 married Henry IV, Holy Roman Emperor, becoming a Holy Roman Empress.
- Catherine Vsevolovna (d. 11 August 1108). A nun. Her date of death is recorded in the Primary Chronicle.
- Maria Vsevolodovna (d. 1089).

== Sources ==
- Филиповский, Ефрем. Краткое историческое и хронологическое описаніе жизни и дѣяній великих князей Россійских, царей, императоров и их пресвѣтлѣйших супруг и детѣй от Р. КH. с 862 года до нынѣ благополучно царствующаго Великаго Государя Императора Александра I. Самодержца Всероссийскаго, Ч.1, 1805 г.
