= Anna Vsevolodovna of Kiev =

Princess of Kievan Rus'

- Died: 3 November 1112
- House: Rurikid
- Father: Vsevolod I of Kiev
- Mother: Anastasia of Byzantium

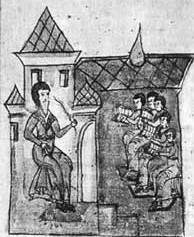
Anna Vsevolodovna's school for girls at the St. Andrew's Monastery, Kyiv

Anna Vsevolodovna of Kiev, also called Yanka or Ianka (died 3 November 1112), was a princess of Kievan Rus', known for having introduced schools for girls in Kievan Rus'. She is one of the six women mentioned by their full personal names in the Primary Chronicle (PVL).

She was the daughter of Vsevolod I of Kiev and Anastasia. She was engaged to the Byzantine prince Konstantios Doukas in 1074. The marriage never materialized, as Constantine Dukas was forced to become a monk in 1081 and died in same year before they could be married.

In 1089, Anna lead an embassy to Byzantium with the purpose of selecting a new metropolitan in Rus'. During her stay in Constantinople, she was impressed by the scholarly learning in Byzantium, at that time a center of culture and education, and upon her return to Rus', she introduced an innovation of learning for women. Her intended Byzantine marriage not having been realized, she remained unmarried, and instead founded a convent for women named Ianchinii. She became a nun and started a school for girls. Her convent school was the first school for girls in Rus'. She organized the school herself, selecting the teachers, preceptresses, requirements and curriculum, offering "writhing, needlework and other useful crafts", such as rhetoric and singing. Her innovation introduced the Byzantine tradition of education for upper class women in Kievan Rus', and during the 12th and 13th centuries, convent schools became common in Kievan Rus', founded and managed by princesses, noblewomen and abbesses, and many aristocratic and clerical women became literate and educated in Greek and Latin, philosophy and mathematics and several nuns and abbesses noted writers.

== Bibliography ==
- Pushkareva, N.; Levin, E. (1997). Women in Russian History: From the Tenth to the Twentieth Century. M. E. Sharpe Incorporated. ISBN 978-0-7656-3270-8.
- Raffensperger, Christian (2024). Name Unknown: The Life of a Rusian Queen. Routledge. p. 232. doi:10.4324/9781003325185. ISBN 978-1-04-003014-1.
- Vernadsky, George (1948). A History of Russia, Volume II: Kievan Russia. Yale University Press. ISBN 0-300-01647-6.
