= Eupraxia of Kiev =

Holy Roman Empress from 1089 to 1105

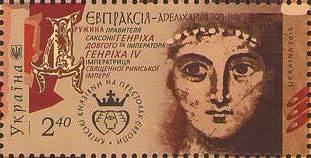
- Eupraxia-Adelaide on a Ukrainian stamp

Holy Roman Empress Queen consort of Germany Queen consort of Italy and Burgundy
- Tenure: 18 August 1089 – 31 December 1105
- Coronation: 18 August 1089
- Born: Eupraxia Vsevolodovna c. 1067
- Died: 10 July 1109 (aged 41–42); Kiev, Kievan Rus'
- Spouses: Henry I, Margrave of the Nordmark (died 1087) Henry IV, Holy Roman Emperor (m. 1089; sep. 1095)
- House: Rurik (by birth); Salian (by marriage)
- Father: Vsevolod I of Kiev
- Mother: Anna Polovetskaya

Eupraxia Vsevolodovna of Kiev (c. 1067 – 10 July 1109; Old East Slavic: Еоупраксиа), sometimes westernised as Praxedis, was a Holy Roman Empress consort. She was the daughter of Vsevolod I, Grand Prince of Kiev, and his wife Anna Polovetskaya, daughter of a Cuman khan. She married Henry IV of Germany in 1089 and took the name Adelaide (or Adelheid).

== First marriage ==
Eupraxia was first married to Henry I the Long, count of Stade and margrave of the Saxon Northern March, who was the son of Lothair Udo II. Eupraxia and Henry had no children before his death in 1087.

== Empress ==
After her first husband's death, Eupraxia went to live in the convent of Quedlinburg, where she met Henry IV, who was then the Saxon king. He was greatly impressed by her beauty. After his first wife Bertha of Savoy died in December 1087, Henry became betrothed to Eupraxia in 1088. The couple married the following year on 18 August 1089 at Cologne. Immediately after the wedding, Eupraxia was crowned and assumed the name Adelaide (or Adelheid).

During Henry's campaigns in Italy, he took Eupraxia-Adelaide with him and kept her imprisoned at the monastery of San Zeno, where the emperor and his troops traditionally stayed, just outside the walled city of Verona. She escaped in 1093 and fled to Canossa, where she sought the aid of Matilda of Tuscany, one of Henry's enemies. Eupraxia-Adelaide accused Henry of ill-treating her in a letter that was read at legatine synod held in Constance in April 1094. The following year, at the urging of Pope Urban II, Eupraxia-Adelaide made a public confession before the church Council of Piacenza, held in the first week of March. She accused Henry of holding her against her will, of forcing her to participate in orgies, and, according to some later accounts, of attempting a black mass on her naked body. According to these later chroniclers, Henry became involved in a Nicolaitan sect, and hosted the sect's orgies and obscene rituals in his palaces. Eupraxia-Adelaide was forced to participate in these orgies, and on one occasion Henry allegedly offered her to his son, Conrad. Conrad refused indignantly, and then revolted against his father. He began to support the papal side in the Italian wars which formed part of the Investiture Controversy. This legend takes its origin from the hostility between Henry and Urban II during the Investiture Controversy.

According to an account written in the mid-twelfth century, because Henry forced Eupraxia-Adelaide to take part in orgies, when she became pregnant she was unable to tell who the father of her child was. Eupraxia-Adelaide thus decided to leave Henry. Christian Raffensperger has suggested that there might be some truth to this story, based on a reference to the death of one of Henry’s sons in Donizo’s Vita Mathildis (written c.1115). Since Henry’s children by his first wife Bertha are accounted for, according to Raffensperger this could be a child by Eupraxia-Adelaide (alternatively, it could be a reference to a child by a mistress, or simply a mistake).

== Later life ==
Eupraxia-Adelaide left Italy for Hungary, where she lived until 1099, when she returned to Kiev. After Henry's death in 1106 she became a nun until her own death in 1109.

== Notes ==
Eupraxia of Kiev Rurik Born: 1071 Died: 1109
Royal titles
Preceded by Bertha of Savoy	Holy Roman Empress; 1089–1093	Succeeded by Matilda of England
