= Boniak =

Cuman khan

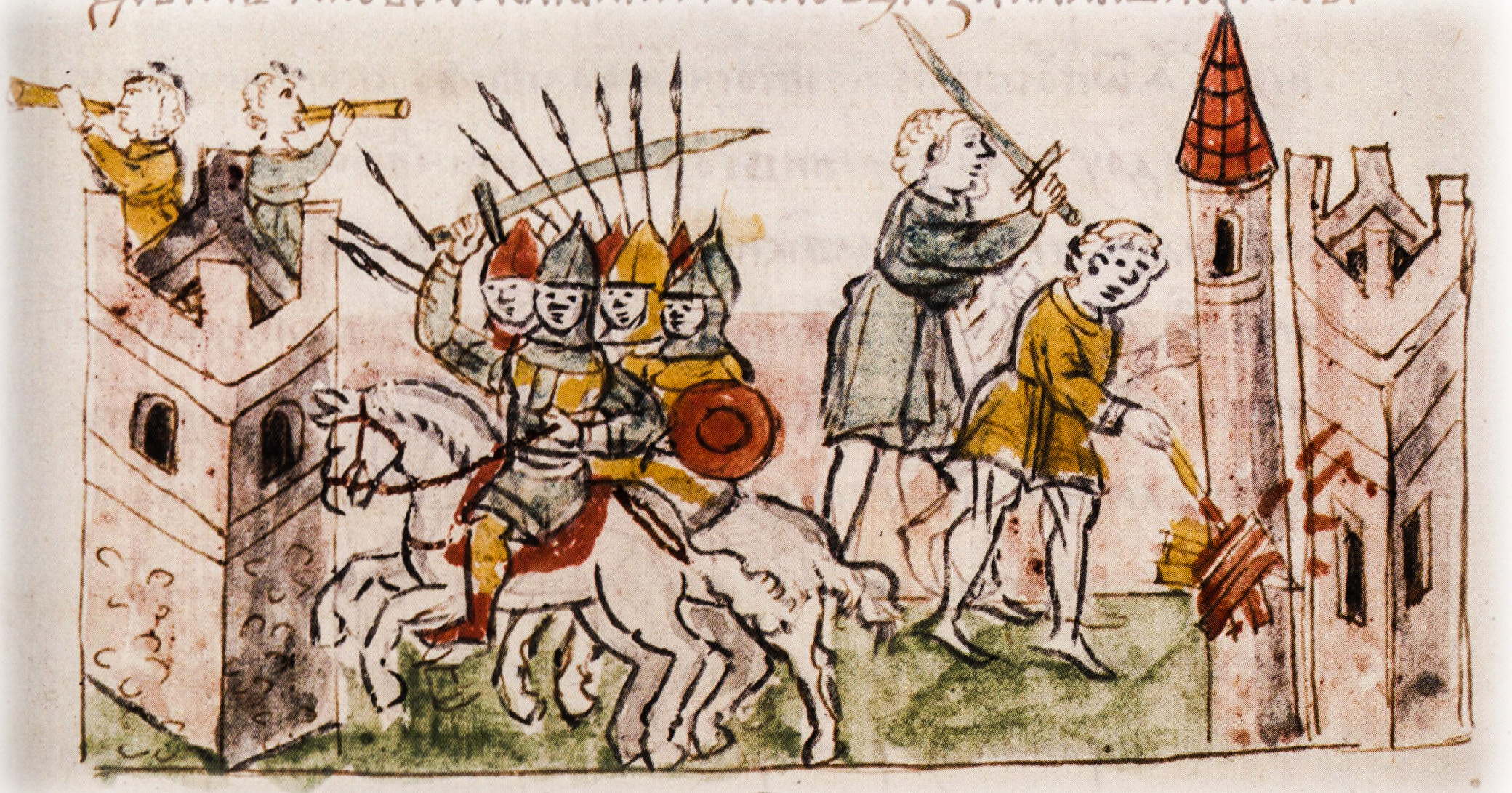
Boniak's attack on Kiev in 1096, miniature from the Radziwill Chronicle, 15th century

Boniak, Bonyak, or Boniak the Mangy (Church Slavonic: Бонякъ Шолудивый; Ukrainian: Боняк Шолудивий; Russian: Боняк Шелудивый; fl. late 11th century – early 12th century), also known as Maniac, was "one of the most prominent Cuman chieftains". He headed a powerful Cuman tribe or clan that inhabited the steppes to west of the Dnieper River. He supported the Byzantines against the Pechenegs in the Battle of Levounion in 1091. He defeated Coloman, King of Hungary, in 1097 or 1099.

== Origins ==
Boniak's descent is uncertain. Svetlana Pletneva associates him with the Burch tribe, Peter B. Golden with the Ölberli tribe of the "Wild Cumans", and Omeljan Pritsak with the Qay clan. Boniak's nickname – the Mangy – may show that he was born with the caul, according to the Hungarian historian Szilvia Kovács. In Anna Komnene's Alexiad, he is called Maniac.

Boniak's exact position cannot be determined, but his career shows that he must have been the head of powerful Cuman tribal federation, tribe, or clan. When pursuing Boniak, Sviatopolk II of Kiev and Vladimir II Monomakh "advanced to the Bug and later beyond the Ros'", according to Vladimir's Testament, which suggests that Boniak's people dwelled between the rivers Dnieper and Southern Bug or Dniester. His participation in military campaigns in the Balkan Peninsula also shows that his people lived near the Lower Danube.

== Career ==
=== First records ===
Along with Tugorkan, Boniak, or Maniak, was one of the Cumans' "outstanding leaders", named by Anna Komnene, who came to assist the Byzantine Emperor Alexios I Komnenos against the Pechenegs. The united Byzantine and Cuman army annihilated the Pechenegs in the Battle of Levounion on 29 April 1091. Historian Florin Curta writes that the two Cuman chieftains plundered the eastern regions of the Kingdom of Hungary on their return to the Desht-i Kypchak, or Cuman steppes. Pletneva says that Boniak and Tugorkan together supported the pretender Pseudo-Diogenes against Emperor Alexios I in 1094, but Anna Komnene did not refer to Boniak's participation in the fights.

=== Wars in Rus' ===
The Russian Primary Chronicle recorded two events connected to Boniak under the year 6604, that is 1095 or 1096 AD. First Boniak and his Cumans "appeared before Kiev ..., and while ravaging the environs, they burned the prince's palace at Berestovo" around 24 May. On 20 July, "Boniak, that godless, mangy thief and bandit, came suddenly to Kiev for the second time" and plundered three monasteries, including the Cave Monastery. During the second campaign, the Cumans "planted two standards before the monastery gates", which may show that they were under the command of two chieftains, according to Kovács. Kovács writes that Boniak's action preceded the campaign that Sviatopolk II and Vladimir Monomach launched against Oleg I of Chernigov. According to Simon Franklin and Jonathan Shepard, Boniak invaded only after Sviatopolk and his army left Kiev for a campaign against Chernigov (Chernihiv in Ukraine). Kovács says that the joint campaign of Sviatopolk and Vladimir Monomach against Boniak's land over the river Ros' that Monomach mentioned in his Testament seems to have been a retaliatory action after Bonia's plundering raids in Kiev.

Sviatopolk of Kiev expelled David Igorevich, Prince of Volhynia, from his principality in the late 1090s. David Igorevich fled to the Cumans and persuaded Bonyak and another Cuman chieftain, Altunopa, to join him to fight against Sviatopolk who had sought assistance from Coloman, King of Hungary. On the eve of the battle against the Hungarians, Boniak "rode away from the troops" and "began to howl like a wolf, till first one and then many wolves answered him with their howls", according to the Russian Primary Chronicle. On his return, Boniak predicted to David Igorevich that they would defeat the Hungarians in the battle. The Cumans annihilated the Hungarian army and seized the royal treasury. According to the Hungarian Illuminated Chronicle, "[r]arely did Hungarians suffer such slaughter as in this battle". However, David Igorevich could not reconquer Volhynia and was again forced to seek refuge among the Cumans. Boniak again joined them and their united armies seized Lutsk and Volodymyr-Volynskyi. According to the Russian Primary Chronicle, these events occurred in 1097, but many historians (including Kovács and Martin Dimnik) say that the fights took place two years later.

The Russian Primary Chronicle recorded that five Rus' princes – Sviatopolk II of Kiev, Vladimir Monomach, Davyd Sviatoslavich, Oleg Sviatoslavich and Yaroslav Sviatoslavich – assembled on the left bank of the Dnieper near Kiev in 1101. On learning of the princes' meeting, all Cuman chieftains sent envoys to them "with propositions of peace". The princes and the Cuman chieftains met at Sakov on the Dnieper and made peace on 15 September. Two years later Sviatopolk II of Kiev, Vladimir Monomach and Davyd Sviatoslavich invaded the Cuman steppes and routed a large Cuman army, killing 20 Cuman chieftains.

According to the Hypatian version of the Russian Primary Chronicle, Boniak made an incursion into the region of Zarub in the Principality of Pereyaslavl, fighting with the Torks and Berendei in the winter of 1105 and 1106. The Russian Primary Chronicle recorded that Boniak "raided and seized many horses in the vicinity of Pereyaslavl' " in May 1107. During the summer, he returned accompanied by Sharukan and other Cuman chieftains and laid siege to Lubno on the Sula River. Vladimir Monomach, Prince of Pereyaslavl, persuaded Svyatopolk II of Kiev and other Rus' princes to come to fight against the invaders. Their unified armies unexpectedly crossed the Sula, forcing the terrified Cumans to lift the siege and leave their camp on 12 August. According to an alternative narration, recorded in Vladimir Monomach's Testament, the united forces of the Rus' princes routed Boniak and his Cuman allies on the banks of the Sula in summer, and Monomach alone defeated Boniak at Lubno alone only in 1108.

Svyatoplok II of Kiev died on 16 April 1113 or 1114. After the Cumans learned of Svyatopluk's death, the Cumans marched as far as Vyr' River. The Cumans were under the command of Aepa and Boniak, according to the Testament of Vladimir Monomach who succeeded Svyatopolk in Kiev. Monomach wrote that he "advanced to meet them as far as" Romny with his sons and Oleg Sviatoslavich, forcing the Cumans to flee.

Boniak is often represented as a sorcerer in Rus' folklore.

== See also ==
- Könchek (Cuman)

== Sources ==
=== Primary sources ===
- Anna Comnena: The Alexiad (Translated by E. R. A. Sewter) (1969). Penguin Books. ISBN 978-0-14-044958-7.
- The Hungarian Illuminated Chronicle: Chronica de Gestis Hungarorum (Edited by Dezső Dercsényi) (1970). Corvina, Taplinger Publishing. ISBN 0-8008-4015-1.
- The Russian Primary Chronicle: Laurentian Text (Translated and edited by Samuel Hazzard Cross and Olgerd P. Sherbowitz-Wetzor) (1953). Medieval Academy of America. ISBN 978-0-915651-32-0.

=== Secondary sources ===
- Curta, Florin (2006). Southeastern Europe in the Middle Ages, 500–1250. Cambridge University Press. ISBN 978-0-521-89452-4.
- Franklin, Simon; Shepard, Jonathan (1996). The Emergence of Rus, 750-1200. Longman. ISBN 0-582-490901.
- Golden, Peter B. (1997). "Wolves, Dogs and Qipčaq Religion". Acta Orientalia Academiae Scientiarum Hungaricae. 50. Akadémiai Kiadó: 87–97. ISSN 0001-6446.
- Kovács, Szilvia (2014). A kunok története a mongol hódításig [The History of the Cumans till the Mongol Conquest] (in Hungarian). Balassi Kiadó. ISBN 978-963-506-946-0.
- Dimnik, Martin (1994). The Dynasty of Chernigov, 1054–1146. Pontifical Institute of Mediaeval Studies. ISBN 0-88844-116-9.
- Pritsak, Omeljan (1982). "The Polovcians and Rus'". Archivum Eurasiae Medii Aevi. 2. Harrassowitz Verlag: 321–380. ISBN 978-3-447-08486-4.
- Spinei, Victor (2003). The Great Migrations in the East and South East of Europe from the Ninth to the Thirteenth Century (Translated by Dana Badulescu). ISBN 973-85894-5-2.
