= Rostislav Vsevolodovich =

- Prince of Pereyaslavl
- Reign: 1088–1093
- Successor: Vladimir II Monomakh
- Born: ?1070
- Died: 26 May 1093
- House: Rurik
- Father: Vsevolod Yaroslavich
- Mother: Anna Polovetskaya, Cuman Princess

Rostislav Vsevolodovich (Note: Russian: Ростислав Всеволодович; Ukrainian: Ростислав Всеволодович) (c. 1070–1093) was the Prince of Pereyaslavl (1078–1093), son of Vsevolod I of Kiev, and half brother of Vladimir Monomakh. He fought at Stuhna river against the Cumans and drowned while fleeing the battle.
