= Vsevolod I of Kiev =

Grand Prince of Kiev from 1078 to 1093

Vsevolod I
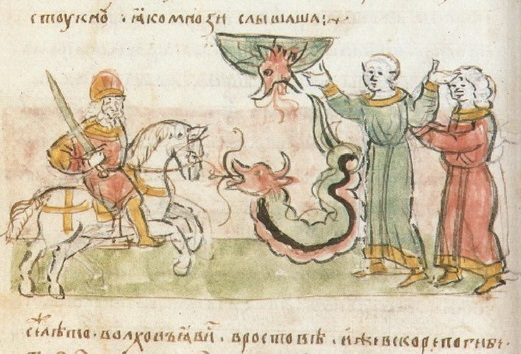
- Miniature from the Radziwiłł Chronicle. Depicts a dragon-meteorite falling during Vsevolod I’s hunt near Vyshhorod

Grand Prince of Kiev
- Reign: 1076–1077
- Predecessor: Sviatoslav II
- Successor: Iziaslav I
- Reign: 1078–1093
- Predecessor: Iziaslav I
- Successor: Sviatopolk II

Prince of Chernigov
- Reign: 1073–1078
- Predecessor: Sviatoslav II of Kiev
- Successor: Vladimir II Monomakh

Prince of Pereyaslavl
- Reign: 1054–1073
- Born: c. 1 February 1030
- Died: 13 April 1093 (62–63); Vyshgorod
- Spouse: Anastasia (?–1067); Anna, a daughter of the Cuman Khan (?–1111)
- Issue: with Anastasia: Vladimir, Ianka with Anna: Eupraxia, Rostislav, Catherine, Maria
Names
- Vsevolod Yaroslavovich (Andrei)
- House: Rurik
- Father: Yaroslav the Wise
- Mother: Ingegerd Olofsdotter
- Religion: Eastern Orthodox Christianity
- Seal

Vsevolod I Yaroslavich (Old East Slavic: Всеволодъ Ꙗрославичь, romanized: Vsevolodǔ Jaroslavičǐ; (Note: Russian: Всеволод I Ярославич, romanized: Vsevolod I Yaroslavich, Ukrainian: Всеволод I Ярославич, romanized: Vsevolod I Yaroslavych, Old Norse: Vissivald) c. 1 February 1030 – 13 April 1093) was Grand Prince of Kiev from 1078 until his death in 1093.

== Early life ==
He was the fifth and favourite son of Yaroslav I the Wise by Ingigerd Olafsdottir. He was born around 1030. On his seal from his last years, he was named "Andrei Vsevolodu" in Greek, implying that his baptismal name was Andrew.

To back up an armistice signed with the Byzantine Emperor Constantine IX Monomachos in 1046, his father married Vsevolod to a Byzantine princess, who according to tradition was named Anastasia or Maria. That the couple's son Vladimir Monomakh bore the family name of the Byzantine emperor suggests she was a member of his close family, but no contemporary evidence attests to a specific relationship and accounts of the Emperor give him no such daughter.

Upon his father's death in 1054, he received in appanage the towns of Pereyaslav, Rostov, Suzdal, and the township of Beloozero which would remain in possession of his descendants until the end of Middle Ages. Together with his elder brothers Iziaslav and Sviatoslav he formed a sort of princely triumvirate which jointly waged war on the steppe nomads, Polovtsy, and compiled the Russkaya Pravda, the first law code of the state. In 1055, Vsevolod launched an expedition against the Turks who had in the previous years expelled the Pechenegs from the Pontic steppes. He also made peace with the Cumans who appeared for the first time in Europe in the same year. The Cumans invaded his principality in 1061 and routed Vsevolod in a battle. Vsevolod persuaded his brother, Iziaslav, and their distant cousin, Vseslav, to join him and they together attacked the Torks in 1060.

In 1067, Vsevolod's Greek wife died and he soon married a Kypchak princess, Anna Polovetskaya. They had a son, Rostislav, who drowned after the Battle of the Stugna River, and daughters, one becoming a nun and another, Eupraxia of Kiev, marrying Emperor Henry IV.

The Cumans again invaded Kievan Rus' in 1068. The three brothers united their forces against them, but the Cumans routed them on the Alta River. After their defeat, Vsevolod withdrew to Pereyaslav. However, its citizens rose up in open rebellion, dethroned Iziaslav, and liberated and proclaimed Vseslav their grand prince. Vsevolod and Sviatoslav made no attempt to expel the usurper from Kiev.

Vsevolod supported Sviatoslav against Iziaslav. They forced their brother to flee from Kiev in 1073. Feodosy, the saintly hegumen or head of the Monastery of the Caves in Kiev remained loyal to Iziaslav, and refused lunch with Sviatoslav and Vsevolod.

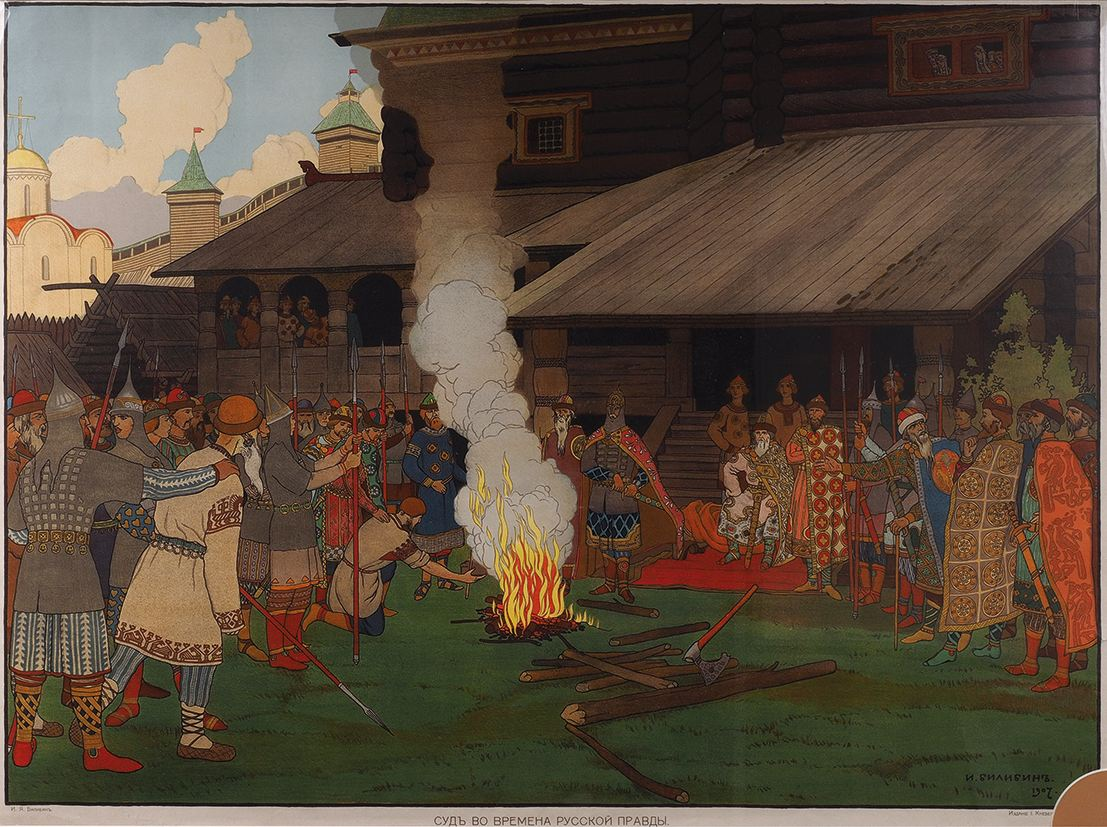
Kievan court in the times of Vsevolod I

After Sviatoslav's death in 1076, Vsevolod enthroned himself in Kiev for a few months before fleeing in early 1077. Once he was back in Kiev, Iziaslav granted Sviatoslav's former principality to Vsevolod, but Sviatoslav's sons considered the Principality of Chernigov as their own patrimony or otchina. Oleg Sviatoslavich made an alliance with the Cumans and invaded Chernigov. Iziaslav came to Vsevolod's rescue and they forced Oleg to retreat, but Iziaslav was murdered in the battle.

== Reign ==
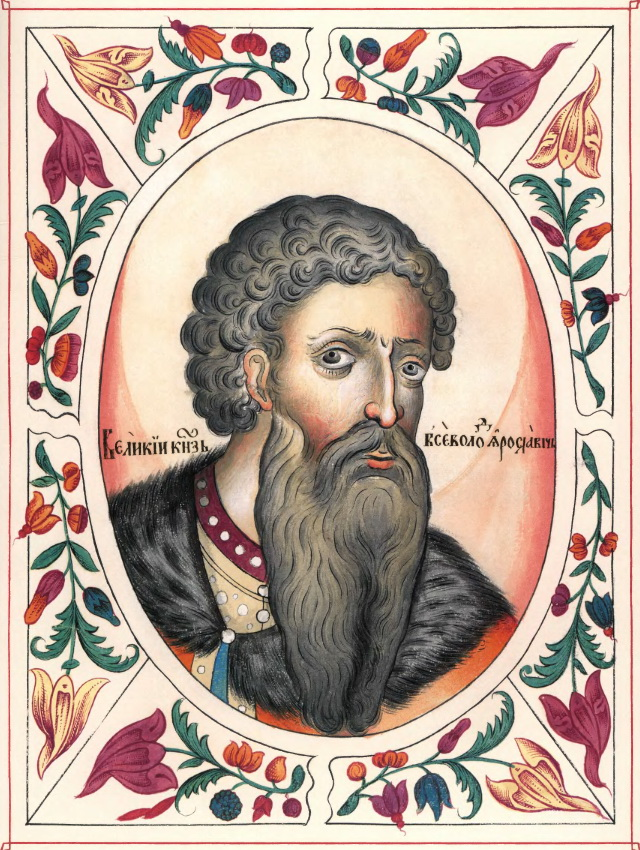
Portrait in the Tsarsky titulyarnik (1672)

After Iziaslav's death, Vsevolod, as their father's only surviving son, took the Kievan throne, thus uniting the three core principalities—Kiev, Chernigov and Pereyaslavl—in Kievan Rus'. He appointed his eldest son, Vladimir Monomach, to administer Chernigov.

The Primary Chronicle writes that the "people no longer had access to the Prince's justice, judges became corrupt and venal". Vsevolod followed his young councilors' advice instead of that of his old retainers in his last years.

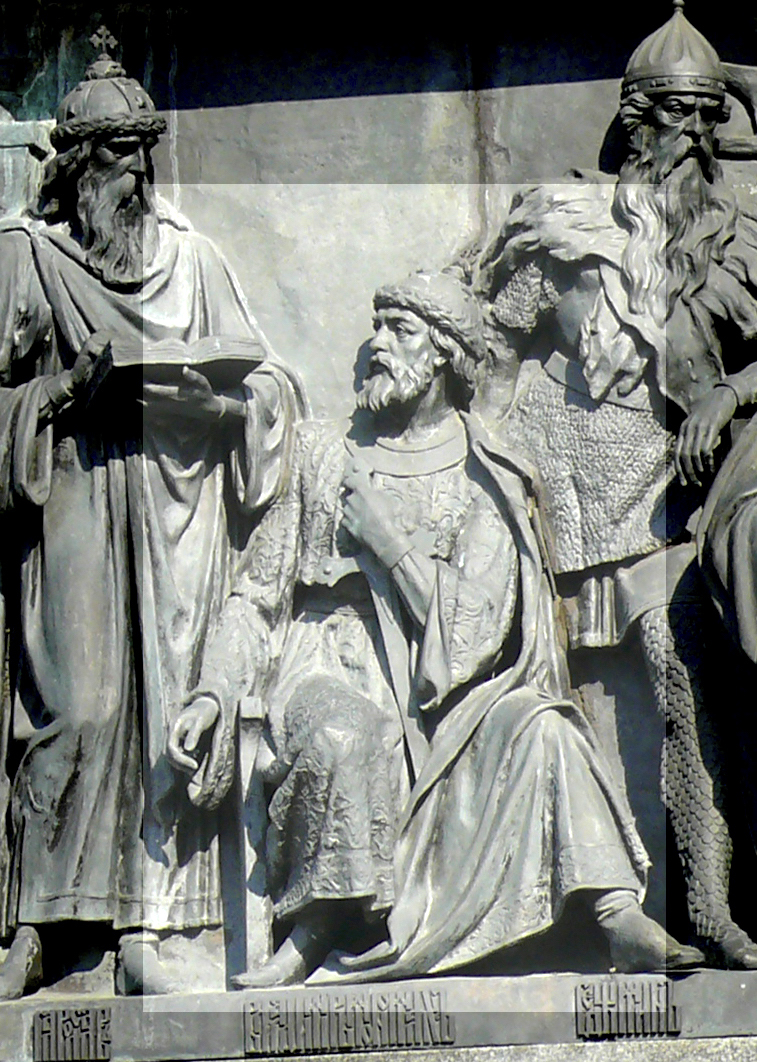
Vladimir Monomakh, Vsevolod's son

Vsevolod spoke five foreign languages, according to Vladimir Monomach's Autobiography. Historian George Vernadsky believes that these probably included Greek and Cuman, because of the nationality of his two wives, and that he likely spoke Latin, Norse, and Ossetian. He lost most of his battles; his eldest son, Vladimir Monomakh, a grand and famous warrior, did most of the fighting for his father. The last years of his reign were clouded by grave illness, and Vladimir Monomakh presided over the government.

== Children ==
Vsevolod and his first wife Anastasia, a relative of Constantine IX Monomachos, had children:

- Vladimir II Monomakh (1053 – 19 May 1125).
- Ianka or Anna Vsevolodovna (d. 3 November 1112) who was engaged to Constantine Dukas in 1074, but never married. She became a nun and started a school for girls.

Vsevolod and his second wife Anna Polovetskaya had children:

- Rostislav Vsevolodovich (1070 – 26 May 1093). Drowned while retreating from the Battle of the Stugna River.
- Eupraxia of Kiev (1071 – 20 July 1109). Married first Henry the Long, Margrave of Nordarm, next Henry IV, Holy Roman Emperor.
- Catherine Vsevolovna (d. 11 August 1108). A nun. Her date of death is recorded in the Primary Chronicle.
- Maria Vsevolodovna (d. 1089).

== Ancestry ==
Ancestors of Vsevolod I of Kiev

8. Sviatoslav I of Kiev
4. Vladimir the Great
9. Malusha
2. Yaroslav the Wise
5. Rogneda of Polotsk or Anna Porphyrogenita
1. Vsevolod I of Kiev
12. Erik Segersäll
6. Olof Skötkonung
13. Sigríð Storråda or Świętosława
3. Ingegerd Olofsdotter of Sweden
7. Estrid of the Obotrites

== Sources ==
- Dimnik, Martin (1994). The Dynasty of Chernigov, 1054–1146. Pontifical Institute of Mediaeval Studies. ISBN 0-88844-116-9.
- Dmytryshyn, Basil (2000). Medieval Russia: A sourcebook 850-1700. Academic International Press.
- Franklin, Simon; Shepard, Jonathan (1996). The Emergence of Rus 750–1200. Longman. ISBN 0-582-49091X.
- Kazhdan, Alexander (1989). "Rus'-Byzantine Princely Marriages in the Eleventh and Twelfth Centuries". Harvard Ukrainian Studies. 12/13. Harvard Ukrainian Research Institute: 414–429.
- Martin, Janet (1993). Medieval Russia, 980–1584. Cambridge University Press. ISBN 978-0-521-67636-6.
- Raffensperger, Christian (2012). Reimagining Europe: Kievan Rus' in the Medieval World. Harvard University Press. ISBN 978-0-674-06384-6.
- The Russian Primary Chronicle: Laurentian Text (Translated and edited by Samuel Hazzard Cross and Olgerd P. Sherbowitz-Wetzor) (1953). Medieval Academy of America. ISBN 978-0-915651-32-0.
- Vernadsky, George (1948). A History of Russia, Volume II: Kievan Russia. Yale University Press. ISBN 0-300-01647-6.

Vsevolod I of Kiev Rurik Born: c. 1030 Died: 1093
Regnal titles
Preceded by ?	Prince of Pereyaslavl; 1054–1073	Succeeded by Vladimir Vsevolodich
Preceded by Sviatoslav Yaroslavich	Prince of Chernigov; 1073–1078	Succeeded by Vsevolod I
Preceded by Sviatoslav Yaroslavich	Grand Prince of Kiev; 1076–1093	Succeeded by Sviatopolk II
