= Hzak =

Hzak (Hza, Kzak) - the Cumans Khan, the head of the Cumans Of Don river (the Burchevichs), a son of the Beglyuk (Belyuk) Khan. In chronicles he is called Koza Burnovich. However, it's not excluding, that Kzak Belyukovich and Koza Burnovich are different persons.

== Biography ==
The Hypatian Codex narrate about defeat of Hzak by the Olgovichs in 1166:

In that winter the Olgovichs attacked the Cumans, the winter was very frosty and Oleg received Hzak's lands, his wife and children, his gold and silver, and Yaroslav received Beglyuk's lands..."

According to S. Pletnyova, this text is not about Hzak, but about Kozel Satanovich, who died near the river Chartoriya in 1180. In 1185 Hzak took part in the battle with Igor Svyatoslavich as an ally of Konchak, and Roman Hzych, a son of Hzak, captured Vsevolod Svyatoslavich, who is a brother of Igor. After the victory over Igor, Hzak raided Posemye, there were no defenders, including Putyvl, while Konchak raided to lands near the Dnieper river, and married his daughter with Igor's son.

"And he invaded their lands and fired their villages. He also fired a fortress near the Putyvl."

== Notes ==
All these notations are in Russian language

== See also ==
- The Tale of Igor's Campaign
