= Köten =

Cuman khan (fl. 1205–1241)

- Khan
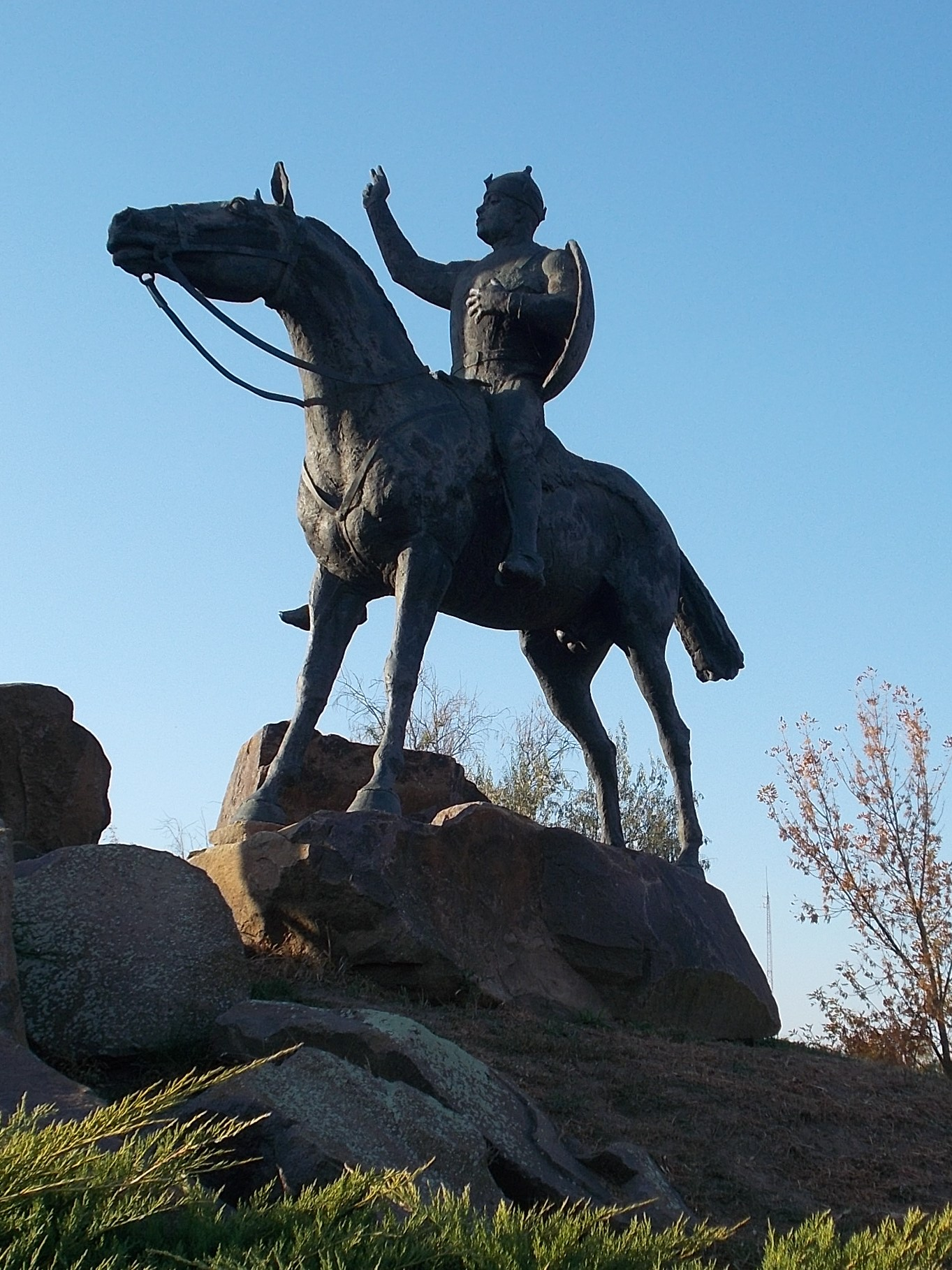
- Statue of Köten in Karcag, Hungary
- Reign: 1223–1241
- Born: Cumania
- Baptised: 1239; Hungary
- Died: 17 March 1241; Pest, Hungary
- Noble family: Terteroba
- Issue: (see section)
- Father: Könchek (possibly)
- Occupation: Cuman–Kipchak khan

Köten (Russian: Котян, romanized: Kotyan; Hungarian: Kötöny; Arabic: Kutan; fl. 1205–1241) was a Cuman–Kipchak chieftain (khan) and military commander active in the mid-13th century. He forged an important alliance with the Kievan Rus' against the Mongols but was ultimately defeated by them at the Kalka River in 1223. After the Mongol victory, Köten led 40,000 "huts" to Hungary, where he became an ally of the Hungarian king and accepted Catholicism, but was nonetheless assassinated by the Hungarian nobility.

== Name and sources ==
Köten, known as Kötöny in Hungarian and Kotjan (or Kotyan) in Russian, had his name spelt variously as Kutan (in Arabic), Kuthen, Kuthens, Koteny and Kuethan. In the Russian annals, his name is rendered Котян Сутоевич (Kotyan Sutoevich, Kotjan Sutoevič). In a charter of Béla IV, a Cuman chieftain Zeyhan or Seyhan is mentioned, assumed to have been Köten. Akhmetova et al. linked his personal name Köten to the Western Kipchak tribal name Kotan.

Köten appears in various contemporary works and chronicles, including the Russian annals, Roger of Torre Maggiore's Carmen miserabile, continuation of the Annals of Heiligenkreuz (Continuatio Sancrucensis), Alberic of Trois-Fontaines' chronicle and various Muslim sources.

An Arabic source – Al-Nuwayri – calls his people Kipchaks; Kutan is mentioned as belonging to the Durut tribe of the Kipchaks. According to Omeljan Pritsak, "Durut" was the Terter tribe of the Cumans. As Old Russian annals narrate, his brother was Somogur (Сомогоуръ), both belonged to the "Sutoevič" clan, according to the source. Soviet historian Svetlana Pletnyova considered this marked the name of their father. According to Timothy May, Köten was one of the khans of the Kipchaks. István Vásáry identified him as Cuman. Peter Benjamin Golden considered "Köten" was also the name of the tribe. In either case, the two peoples were part of the Cuman–Kipchak confederation, known as Cumania in Latin, Desht-i Qipchaq in Islamic sources (from Turkic), and Polovtsy in East Slavic. Some sources regard Cumans and Kipchak as the western and eastern names for the same people.

== Life ==
=== Galicia ===
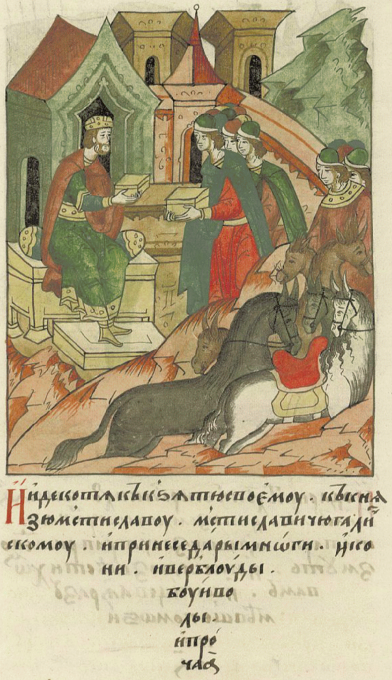
Köten presents gifts to Mstislav Mstislavich as depicted in the 16th-century Facial Chronicle

According to some arguments, his father was Könchek, who changed the old Cuman system of government whereby rulership went to the most senior tribal leader; he instead passed it on to his son Köten. Köten and his brother Somogur are first mentioned by Russian annals in 1202 (but in fact, it occurred in 1205), when supported Rurik Rostislavich in the war against Roman Mstislavich. During that time, they also had a confrontation with the Hungarian troops. Later, Köten appeared as an ally of Mstislav the Bold, who was a claimant to the throne of Galicia since 1219. Mstislav married to one of Köten's daughters prior to 1223. Köten forged an alliance with the princes of Kievan Rus against the Mongols (also called Tatars) after a defeat in 1222. He gave "numerous presents: horses, camels, buffaloes and mistresses. And he presented these gifts to them, and said the following, 'Today the Mongols took away our land and tomorrow they will come and take away yours'." The Cumans were ignored for almost a year, however, as the Rus' had suffered from their raids for decades. The Cuman–Kipchak confederation under Köten and a Rus army of 80,000 men under his son-in-law Mstislav the Bold fought a battle at the Kalka River (Kalchyk, near Mariupol) against a Mongol contingent commanded by Jebe and Subutai. The Rus-Cuman army was routed and had to retreat on 31 May 1223. Köten narrowly escaped from the battlefield, while other Cuman chieftains were killed. Köten was deposed from power in that year, but he remained leader of the Terteroba clan.

Following the battle, some historians – Joseph von Hammer-Purgstall, István Gyárfás, Josef Markwart – argue that Köten and his Cumans settled down along the southern Volga and lived there until their expulsion in the end of the 1230s. However, according to Old Russian sources, Köten and his people lived west of the river Dnieper. Pletnyova considered Köten and his Cumans lived in the area between the rivers Dnieper and Don prior to the Battle of the Kalka River. Köten continued to support Mstislav's campaigns until the latter's death in 1228. For instance, in 1226, a boyar named Žiroslav threatened those who disobeyed Mstislav that he would hand them over to his father-in-law Köten, who destined for them a cruel fate. Following the death of Mstislav, Köten supported the claim of Michael of Chernigov against Daniel of Galicia. In 1229, he swore loyalty to Daniel. His Cumans and the prince of Galicia jointly fought against Hungary in that year (or in 1230), while the Hungarians commanded by Duke Béla was supported by the baptized chieftain Bortz. Köten and his Cumans were also involved in Daniel's campaign against Andrew of Hungary, Prince of Galicia in 1233.

In the early spring of 1237, the Mongols attacked the Cuman-Kipchaks. Some of the Cuman-Kipchaks surrendered; it was this element that was later to form the ethnic and geographic basis of the Mongol khanate known to the former lords of the country as the "Kipchak khanate". Known also as the Golden Horde, the Kipchak khanate belonged to one of the branches of Jochi's house -Genghis Khan's eldest son. The Kipchak leader Bačman was captured in 1236–1237 on the Volga banks by Möngke, and then executed. According to Rashid-al-Din Hamadani, Berke led a third campaign in the autumn of 1238 which inflicted final defeat on the Cumans-Kipchaks. The chronicles claim that it was Batu Khan that defeated Köten on the Astrakhan steppes. Several Cumans swore loyalty to the Mongols, while others decided to flee towards the Balkan Peninsula. Köten refused to submit to Mongol rule too. Afterwards, Köten led 40,000 "huts" (families, around 70-80,000 people) to Hungary, fleeing the Mongols. With the disintegration of the hierarchy of power, Köten became the supreme khan of the Cumans in 1239, according to historian György Györffy. Previously, Köten was second or third in rank among the major Cuman leaders after Yury Konchakovich (son of Könchek) and Danyiil Kobjakovic (son of Kobiak or Kobek).

=== Hungary ===
In the year of the Lord's Incarnation 1242 [sic], it happened that Kuten [Köten], king [khan] of the Cumans, sent solemn envoys to the said king [Béla IV of Hungary] with the message that he had fought the Tatars [Mongols] for many years and twice defeated them, but the third time [...] they devastated most of his land by force and killed his people. Therefore, [...] he was ready to submit himself and his people [...] and follow him in the Catholic faith. Hearing this, the king was filled with exceeding great joy, partly because a prince who hitherto was as equal to him [...]. After several exchanges of envoys from both parties, the aforesaid Kuten set out with his people to come to Hungary.

— Master Roger's Epistle to the Sorrowful Lament upon the Destruction of the Kingdom of Hungary by the Tatars

After returning from Magna Hungaria in 1236, Friar Julian informed King Béla IV of Hungary of the Mongols, who had by that time reached the Volga River and were planning to invade Europe. In the subsequent years, the Mongols invaded Desht-i Qipchaq—the westernmost regions of the Eurasian Steppes—and routed the Cumans. Fleeing the Mongols, at least 40,000 Cumans under the leadership of Köten approached the eastern borders of the Kingdom of Hungary and demanded admission in 1239. Köten was willing to acknowledge the king's supremacy and submitted himself to him, although he was previously "equal to him", as Master Roger emphasizes. Béla sent his emissaries, some friars of the Dominican Order. The monarch only agreed to give them shelter after Köten promised to convert together with his people to Christianity, and to fight against the advancing Mongols. Köten accepted the conditions and Béla IV, who, with his entourage, went to the border to receive him, granted asylum to the Cuman refugees. This event most plausibly occurred at the Easter of 1239 (27 March), while Gyula Pauler considered the arrival of the Cumans took place in the autumn of 1239. In contrast to the narration of Master Roger, Alberic of Trois-Fontaines' chronicle claims that Köten came to Hungary after being captured by Hungarians in battle, disguised as a Mongol.

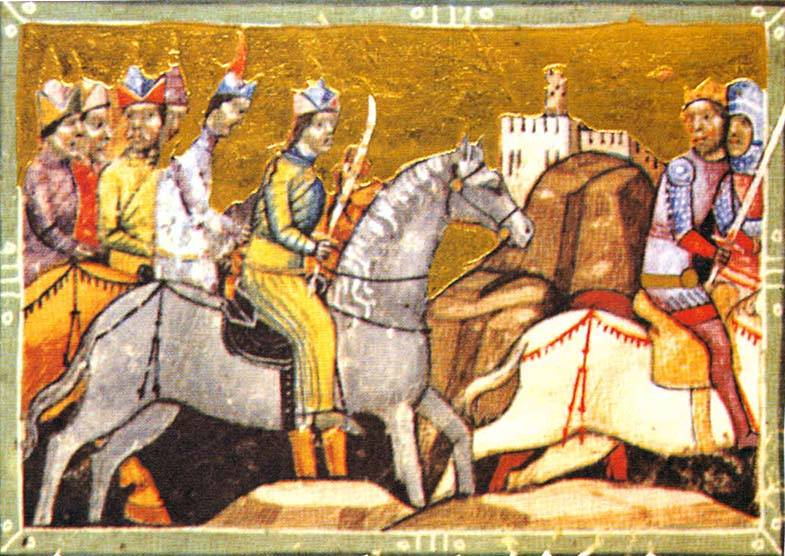
First Mongol invasion of Hungary in 1241–1242. The Tatars are dressed in Cuman clothes with sabers. (Chronicon Pictum, 1358)

In accordance with his oath, Köten converted to Roman Catholicism, being baptized by the Hungarian monarch himself in 1239. Other Cuman chieftains were baptized by members of the Hungarian elite. After that, they entered marriages with Hungarian noblewomen. However, the king's decision of granting asylum to the Cumans caused social, economic, and political tension, and the settlement of masses of nomadic Cumans in the plains along the river Tisza gave rise to many conflicts between them and the local villagers. Béla, who needed the Cumans' military support, rarely punished them for their robberies, rapes, and other misdeeds. His Hungarian subjects thought that he was biased in the Cumans' favor, thus "enmity emerged between the people and the king", according to Master Roger.

After a long siege and fierce fighting within the city, Kiev fell on 6 December 1240 and was largely destroyed. The advancing Mongols reached the Hungarian border soon thereafter. The Mongols gathered in the lands bordering Hungary and Poland under the command of Batu Khan in December 1240. They demanded Béla's submission to their Great Khan Ögödei, but Béla refused to yield. King Béla then installed front line defenses at the Carpathian Mountains, after which he returned to Buda and called a council of war and ordered unity against the Mongols. The opposite happened, however, as many of the barons were hostile towards the Cumans. The Hungarian barons noted that there were Cumans in the Mongol armies, but they did not realize that this was because they were conscripted into it and had no say in the matter. In particular the barons did not trust Köten, commemorating his former alliance with the "Russians" and his struggles against the Hungarians. They blamed the Cumans acted as "advance guard" of the Mongols, to get to know the conditions of the country, to learn their language, and when they are informed of their arrival, to start the fight against the Hungarians, so that they will be able to take possession of the Verecke Pass (or "Russian Gate", present-day Veretskyi Pass, Ukraine) more easily, according to Master Roger, despite the fact that the Mongols had attacked Köten's people for nearly 20 years. This chaos pushed Béla IV into a corner; feeling he needed to show his strength and keep the rebellious barons on his side, he ordered Köten and his family, along with other chief men, to be placed under house arrest.

The Mongols broke through the barricades erected in the Verecke Pass on 12 March 1241. Duke Frederick II of Austria, who arrived to assist Béla against the invaders, defeated a small Mongol troop near Pest. He seized prisoners, including Cumans from the Eurasian Steppes who had been forced to join the Mongols. When the citizens of Pest realized the presence of Cumans in the invading army, mass hysteria emerged. The townsfolk accused Köten and their Cumans of cooperating with the enemy. A riot broke out and the mob with the leadership of some barons massacred Köten and his retinue on 17 March 1241. The Continuatio Sancrucensis claims that Köten, for fear of lynching, murdered his family and committed suicide before their capture. The arriving Hungarians then cut off their heads and threw them onto the streets outside the house in an act of brutality that had dire consequences. On hearing about Köten's fate, his Cumans decided to leave Hungary and destroyed many villages on their way to the Balkans. A Hungarian army, led by Bishop Bulcsú Lád and Nicholas Szák, who intended to join the royal army in the campaign against the Mongols, came across the marauders in central Hungary, and was wiped out. Thereafter the Cumans left Hungary for the Second Bulgarian Empire. With the Cumans' departure Béla lost his most valuable allies. The Hungarian army was virtually annihilated in the Battle of Mohi on the Sajó River on 11 April 1241.

== Legacy ==
The enraged Cuman-Kipchak masses began to plunder the countryside, and moved southwards in the country. They crossed the Danube and reached Syrmia (called Marchia by Roger). After causing much destruction and havoc in Hungary, they left the country for Bulgaria. There is a hypothesis that the Terter dynasty, which eventually ruled Bulgaria, descended from Köten's clan.

Following the Mongol invasion, Béla IV invited the Cumans, who had in 1241 left Hungary, to return and settle in the plains along the river Tisza. He even arranged the engagement of his firstborn son, Stephen, who was crowned king-junior in or before 1246, to Elizabeth, a daughter of a Cuman chieftain. According to some opinions, Elizabeth's father was the late Köten. In this context, he was grandfather of King Ladislaus IV of Hungary (also "Ladislaus the Cuman"). However, a charter of her father-in-law, Béla IV, refers to one Seyhan, a Cuman chieftain as his kinsman, implying that Seyhan was Elizabeth's father. Seyhan was possibly the leader of the Cumans whom Béla had invited to settle in the plains along the river Tisza around 1246.

== Family ==
- Maria who married Mstislav Mstislavich, who led uprising against Hungarians and became a ruler of the Galicia–Volhynia (r. 1220)
- A daughter who married Narjot III de Toucy (–1241). She became a nun after his death.
- Elizabeth the Cuman who married Stephen V of Hungary, King of Hungary
- He also had an unidentified daughter, who married Hungarian noble Gregory Monoszló

== Family tree ==
| | Köten (Note: Also known: Kuthen/Koten/Kötöny/Kotjan) |
| Daniel (Note: Also known: Subilaj) | George (Note: Also known: Kanya) | Elisabeth the Cuman + Stephen V of Hungary | Unnamed daughter + Narjot III de Toucy | Maria + Mstislav Mstislavich |

== In popular culture ==
The video game Age of Empires II: Definitive Edition contains a five-chapter campaign titled "Kotyan Khan", starting with his rallying the remains of the Cuman-Kipchak confederation and concluding with the arrival of the Cumans in Bulgaria as well as their later return to Hungary.

== See also ==
- George I of Bulgaria
- Dobrotitsa
- Shishmanids
- Asen dynasty
- Mongol invasion of Rus'

== Notes ==
Köten Terter clan Born: ? Died: 17 March 1241
| Preceded by ? | Terter chief 1223–1228 | Unknown |
