= Könchek (Cuman) =

Polovtsian khan (died 1187)

Könchek (also spelled Konchak, Končak; Russian/Ukrainian: Кончак; died 1187) was a Polovtsian khan of the 12th century.

== Biography ==
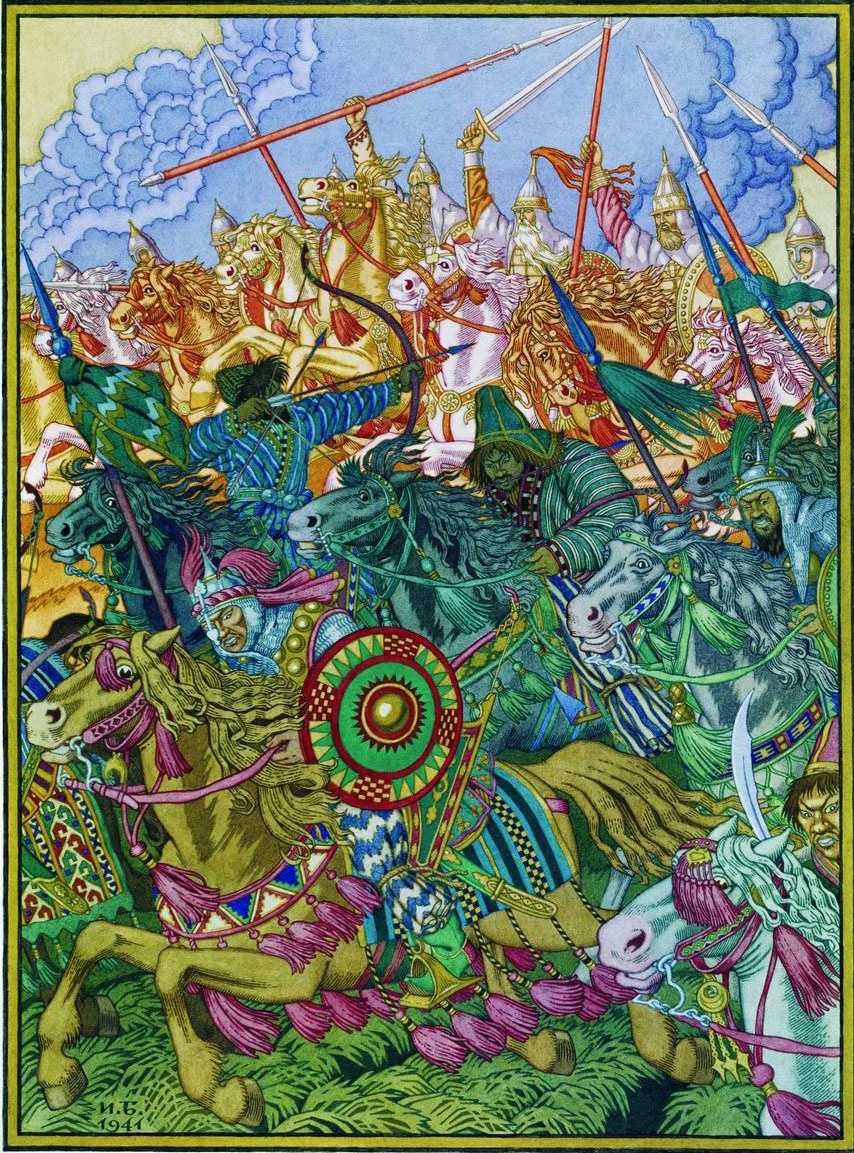
Polovtses fighting Russian troops – illustration: Ivan Bilibin for The Tale of Igor's Campaign)

He was a son of Otrok and a grandson of Sharukan. In the second half of the 12th century, Könchek unified the Polovtsian tribes. Taking advantage of divisions among Russian princes, he made war against them in 1170 and 1180 by attacking the principalities of Kiev, Pereyaslavl, and Chernigov. His raids were particularly destructive along the Sula River.

In 1171, Könchek allied with Oleg II Svyatoslavich, the prince of Novgorod-Seversk, in fighting the other Russian princes, but in 1184, during an attack led against the principality of Kiev, his troops were beaten near the Khorol river by the prince Sviatoslav III. The following year, Könchek defeated the prince Igor Svyatoslavich, who was taken prisoner near the Kaiala River (possibly the modern Kalmius River). Igor's campaign against Könchek became the subject of an epic poem, The Tale of Igor's Campaign.

Könchek died in 1187. His daughter Svoboda ("Liberty" in Russian) married Vladimir III Igorevich, son of Igor, in 1188. In 1203, his son Yuri took Kiev as an ally of the prince Rurik Rostislavich who, chased from Kiev, recruited from the Polovts tribes to regain power. According to some arguments, Köten and Somogur were his sons, and he changed the old Cuman system of government whereby rulership went to the most senior tribal leader; he instead passed it on to his son Köten.

== Legacy ==
Konchek appears as a character in the opera Prince Igor, by Alexander Borodin (1890). He appears in the Polovtsian Dances in that work.

== Bibliography ==
- Martin Dimnik, The Dynasty of Chernigov, 1146–1246, Cambridge University Press, 2003.
- Boris Grekov, Aleksandr Yakubovsky, The Golden Horde and Russia: Tatar rule in the XIII and XIV of the Yellow Sea to the Black Sea'. Translated from Russian by François Thuret, Payot, 1961.
- Novgorod First Chronicle
