= Cumania =

Turkic confederation (10th century – 1241)

Cuman–Kipchak Confederation Dasht-i Qipchaq
- 10th century–1241
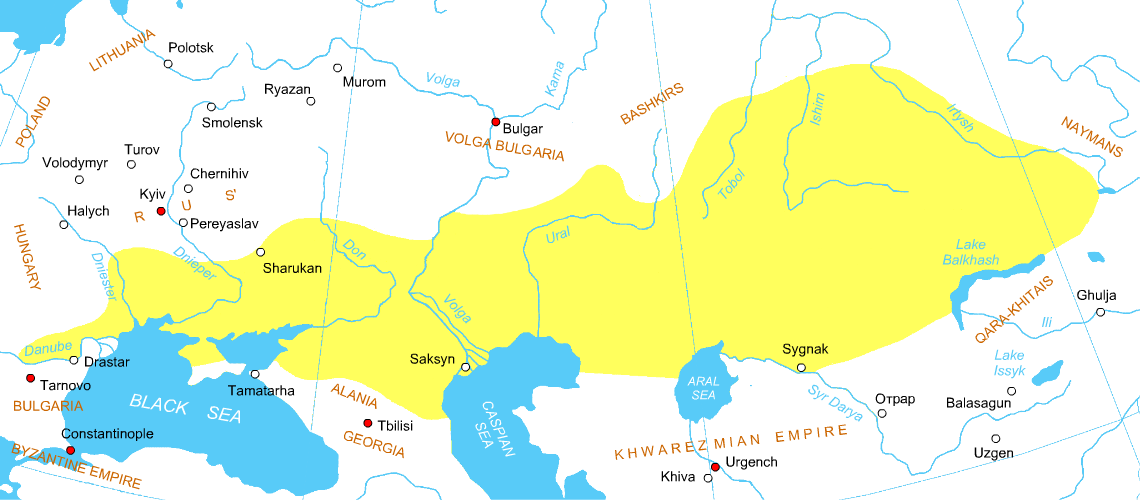
- Cumania (Dasht-i Qipchaq) c. 1200

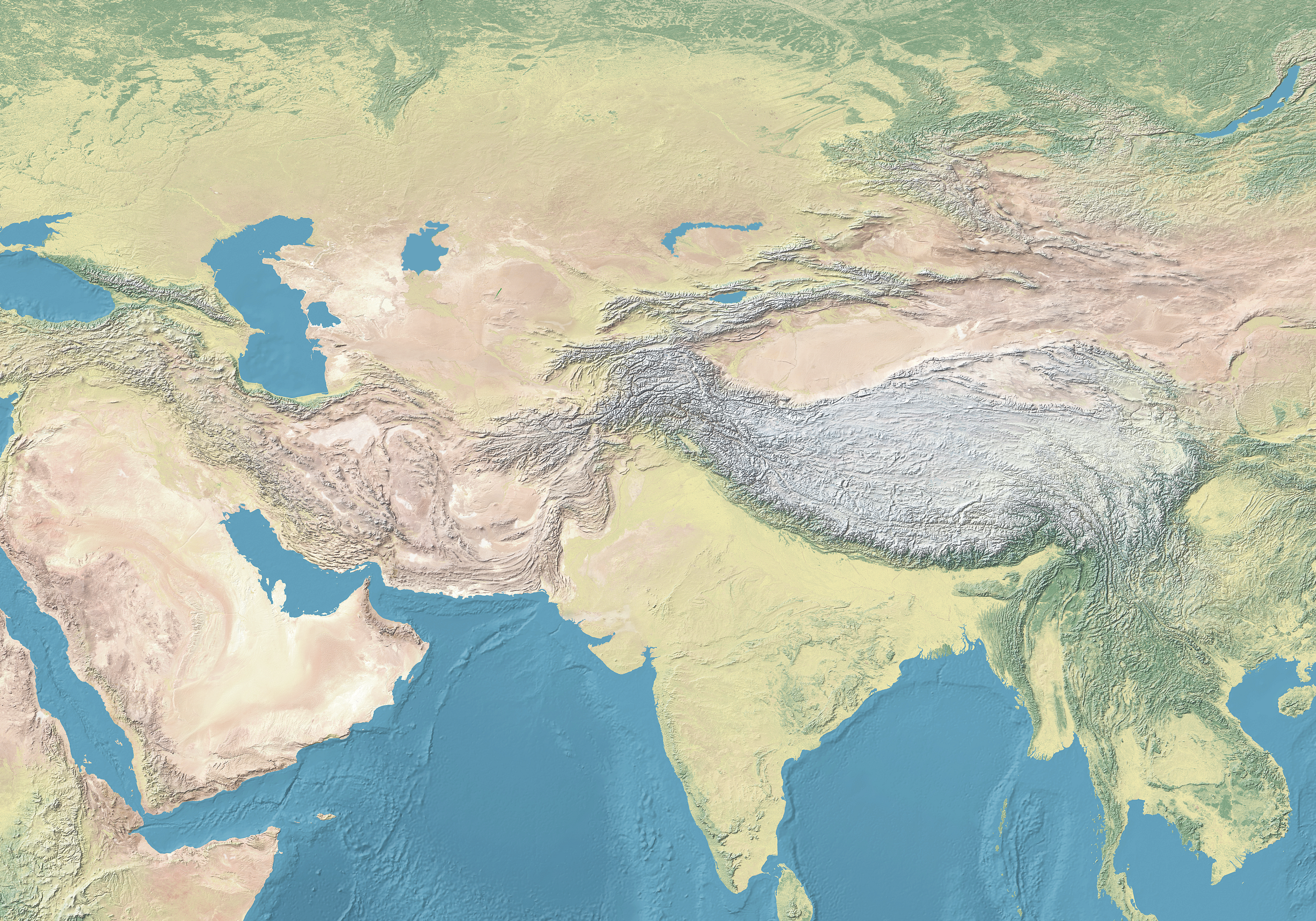
- The Cumans in relation to main Central Asian polities c. 1000
- Status: Nomadic tribal confederation
- Capital: Sarai
- Common languages: Kipchak languages (including Cuman)
- Religion: Tengrism, Christianity, Islam
- Demonyms: Cuman, Kipchak
- History
  - Established: 10th century
  - Disestablished: 1241
Preceded by	Succeeded by
Kimek–Kipchak confederation; Khazaria	Mongol Empire

The name Cumania originated as the Latin exonym for the Cuman–Kipchak confederation, which was a tribal confederation in the western part of the Eurasian Steppe, between the 10th and 13th centuries. The confederation was dominated by two Turkic nomadic tribes: the Cumans (also known as the Polovtsians or Folban) and the Kipchaks. Cumania was known in Islamic sources as Dasht-i Qipchaq (دشت قپچاق), which means "Steppe of the Kipchaks" or "Kipchak Plains" in Persian, and al-Qumāniyīn (القمانيين), which means "The Cumans" or "The Cuman people" in Arabic. Russian sources have referred to Cumania as the "Polovtsian Steppe" (Половецкая степь, Polovetskaya step), or the "Polovtsian Plain" (Поле Половецкое, Pole Polovetskoye).

A different, more organized entity that was later known as the Golden Horde was also referred to as "Comania" by Armenian chronicler Hethum (Hayton) of Korykos. "Cumania" was also the source of names, or alternate names, for several smaller areas – some of them unconnected geographically to the area of the federation – in which Cumans and/or Kipchaks settled, such as the historic region of Kunság in Hungary, and the former Diocese of Cumania (in Romania and Hungary). Hethum of Korykos described Cumania as "wholly flat and with no trees". Ibn Battuta said of Cumania, "This wilderness is green and grassy with no trees, nor hills, high or low ... there is no means of travelling in this desert except in wagons." Battuta's contemporary, Hamdallah Mustawfi, elaborated,

This is of the Sixth Clime, its plains bear excellent pasturage ... but there are here few houses or towns or villages. Most of the inhabitants are nomads of the plain ... Most of the lands here are swamps ... The pasturage, however, being excellent, horses and cattle are numerous, and the population for the most part subsists on the produce thereof. The climate is cold, and their water comes from springs and wells.

== History and political interactions ==
Kazakh Tamga of Kypchak tribe

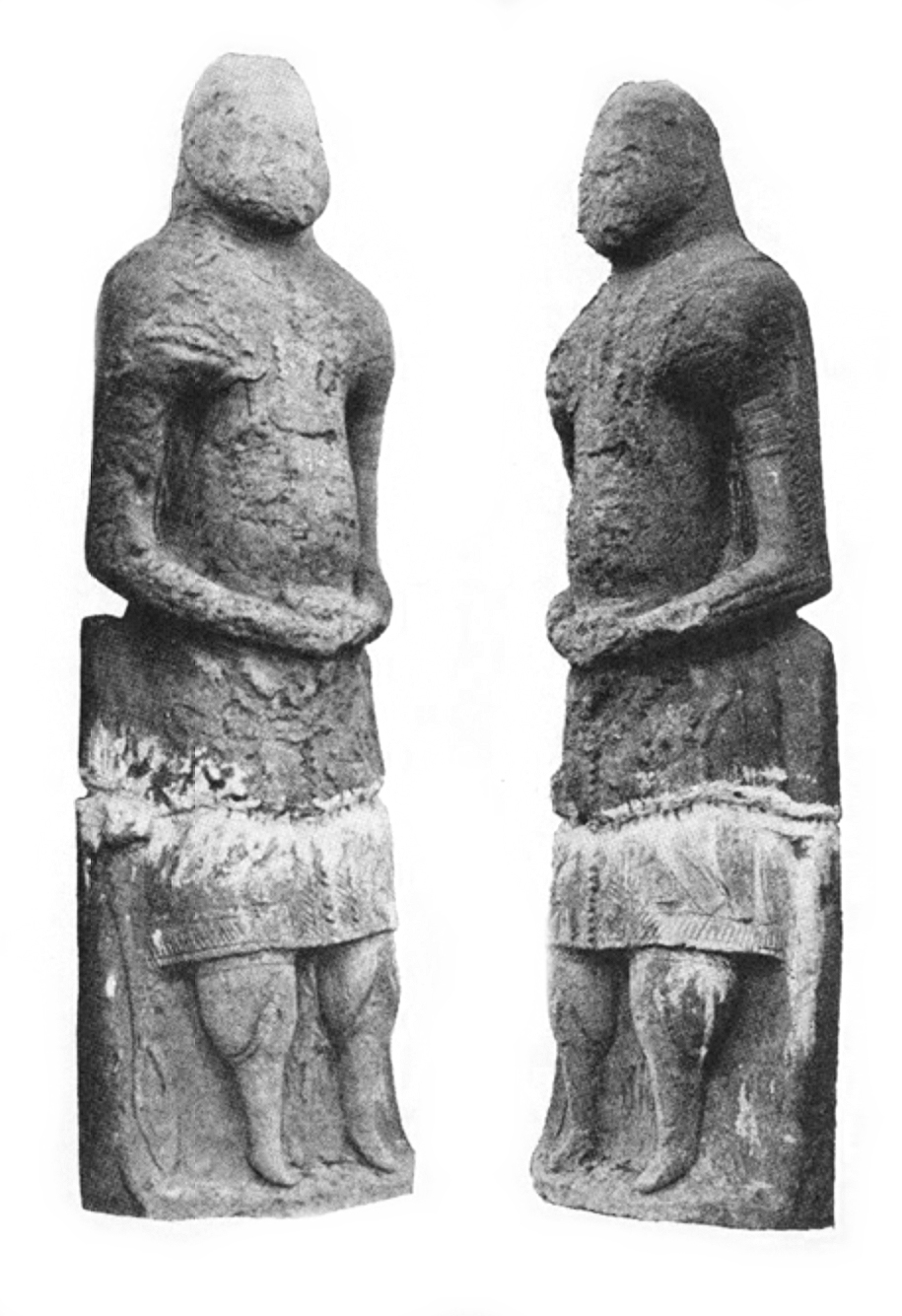
Cuman-Qıpčaq warrior-statue with musical instrument carved at its feet (left). Simferopol Museum, Crimea, Ukraine.

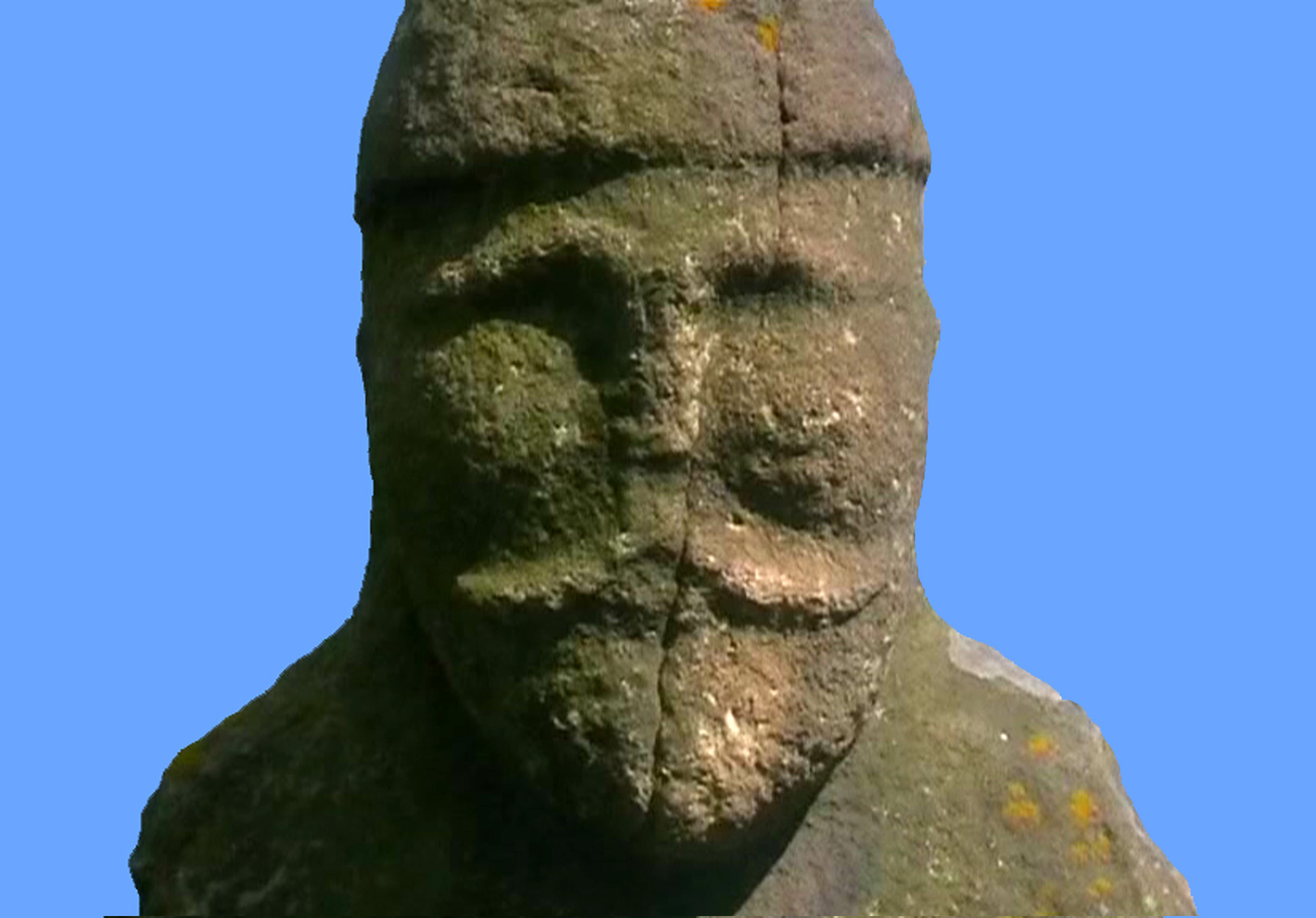
Cuman/Kipchak statue, 12th century, Luhansk

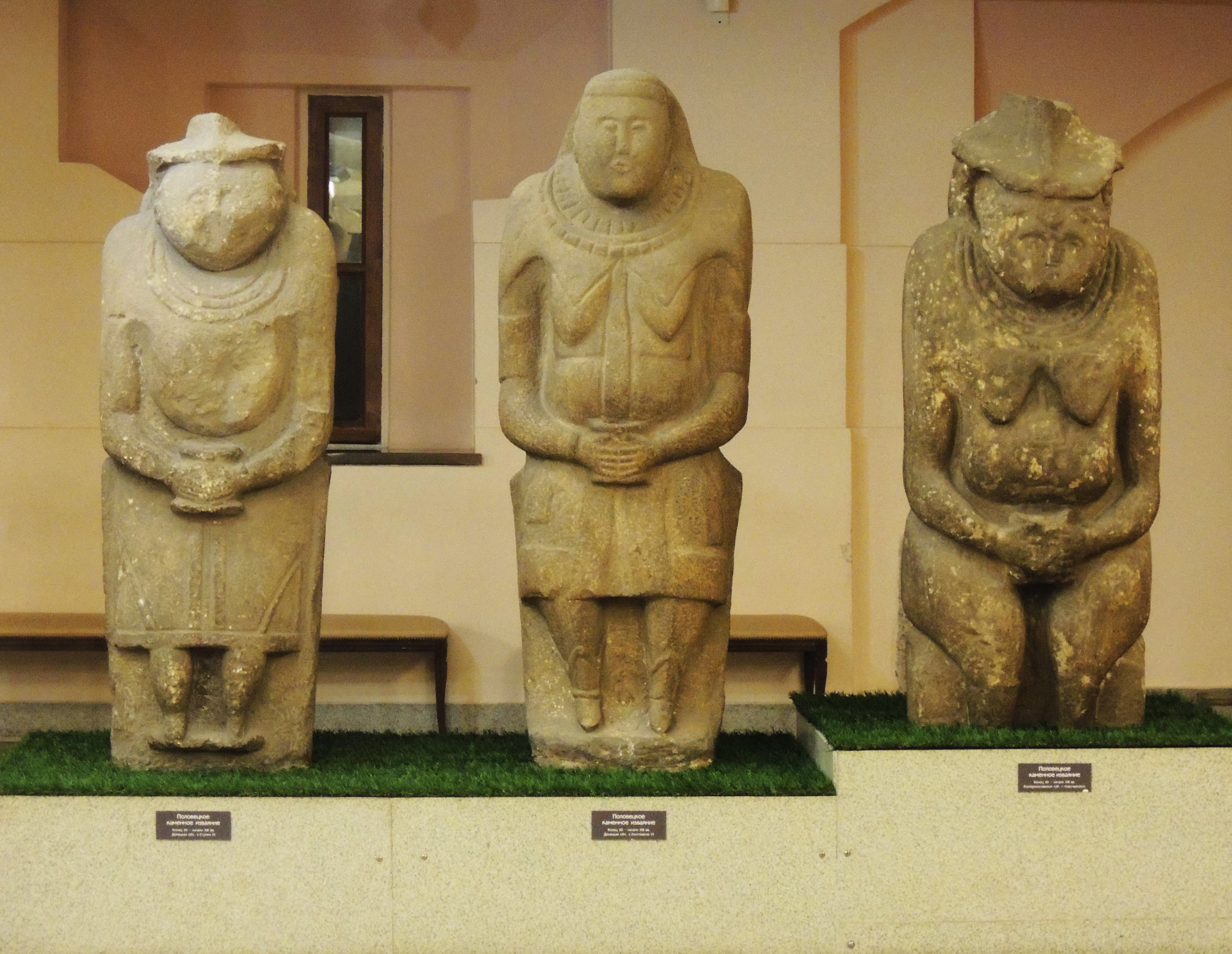
Cuman statues, Moscow State Historical Museum

By the 11th and 12th centuries, the nomadic confederacy of the Cumans and (Eastern) Kipchaks (who were a distinct tribe with whom the Cumans created a confederacy, although other sources say that Cumans and Kipchak are simply different names for the same tribe) were the dominant force over the vast territories stretching from present-day Kazakhstan, southern Russia, Ukraine, to southern Moldavia and eastern Wallachia in present-day Romania. Considering the nomadic way of life of these peoples, these frontiers can be regarded only as approximate; hence there were various definitions of what Cumania meant over the course of time. Depending on their region and their time, different sources each used their own vision to denote different sections of the vast Cuman territory: in Byzantine, Russian, Georgian, Armenian, Persian and Muslim sources, Cumania meant the Pontic steppe, that is the steppelands to the north of the Black Sea and on its eastern side as far as the Caspian Sea, where the lowlands between the Dnieper, the Volga, the Ural and the Irtysh Rivers were favorable to the nomadic lifestyle of the Cumans. Later, for a short time period, in Western sources Cumania also referred to the area in eastern Wallachia and southern Ukraine (centered on the lowlands of Budjak and the Bărăgan Plain), referring to the area where the first contact between the Cumans and the Western Christians took place, and where, later, the Cumans of the region would accept Catholicism.

Using the traditional Turkic assignment of colours to the cardinal points, White Cumania used to be located to the west and may have denoted eastern Wallachia, while Black Cumania was located to its north and may have denoted Moldavia.

As in the case of many other large nomadic Eurasian confederacies, the ethnonym "Cuman" (referring to the inhabitants of Cumania) denoted different ethnic realities. While the main component was probably the Turkic-speaking tribes, the confederacy included other ethnic components as well. Cumania was primarily a political name, referring to the leading, integrating tribe or clan of the confederacy. The Cumans, when they first appear in written sources, are members of a confederacy irrespective of their tribal origin. Former tribal names disappeared when the tribe in question became part of a political unit. For instance, when we hear of an incursion of Cumans, it means that certain tribes of the Cuman confederacy took part in a military enterprise. In his "History of the Mongols", the Persian historian Rashid-al-Din Hamadani, referred to Cumania around 1236–1237, during the Mongol invasion of Möngke, the future Great Khan of the Mongol Empire. Among others, he mentions the Kipchaks, the Turkophone Asi (probably the same as the later Jassic tribe) and the "Karaulaghi" (Black, i.e. "from the north", Vlachs).

The vast territory of this Cuman-Kipchak realm, consisting of loosely connected tribal units that were the military dominating force, was never politically united by a strong central power. Cumania was neither a state nor an empire, but different groups under independent rulers, or khans, who acted on their own initiative, meddling in the political life of the surrounding states: the Russian principalities, Bulgaria, Byzantium and the Wallachian states in the Balkans, Armenia and Georgia (see Kipchaks in Georgia) in the Caucasus, and Khwarezm, having reached as far as to create a powerful caste of warriors, the Mamluks, serving the Muslim Arab and Turkish Caliphs and Sultans.

In the Balkans, we find the Cumans in contact with all of the statal entities of that time, fighting with the Kingdom of Hungary, allied with the Bulgarians and Vlachs against the Byzantine Empire. For example, Thocomerius, by name apparently a Cuman warlord (also known as Tihomir, he might have been a Bulgarian noble), was possibly the first one to unite the Bulgarian states, north from the Danube, from the west and the east of the Olt River, and his son Basarab I is considered the first ruler of the united and independent Wallachia. This interpretation corresponds with the general view of the situation of the Romanian lands in the 11th century, with the natives living in collections of village communities, united in various small confederacies, with more or less powerful chiefs trying to create little kingdoms, some paying tribute to the various militarily dominant nomadic tribes (see Romania in the Middle Ages).

This Pontic Cumania (and the rest of the Cumanias to the east) ended its existence in the middle of the 13th century, with the Mongol invasion of Europe. In 1223, Jebe and Subutai defeated the Cumans and their Rus' allies at the Battle of Kalka (in modern Ukraine), and the final blow came in 1241, when the Cuman confederacy ceased to exist as a political entity, with the remaining Cuman tribes being dispersed, either becoming subjects of the Mongol conquerors as part of what was to be known as the Golden Horde, or fleeing to the west, to the Byzantine Empire, the Bulgarian Empire, and the Kingdom of Hungary.

== Kunság and the Catholic Diocese of Cumania ==
Coat of Arms of early modern Kunság

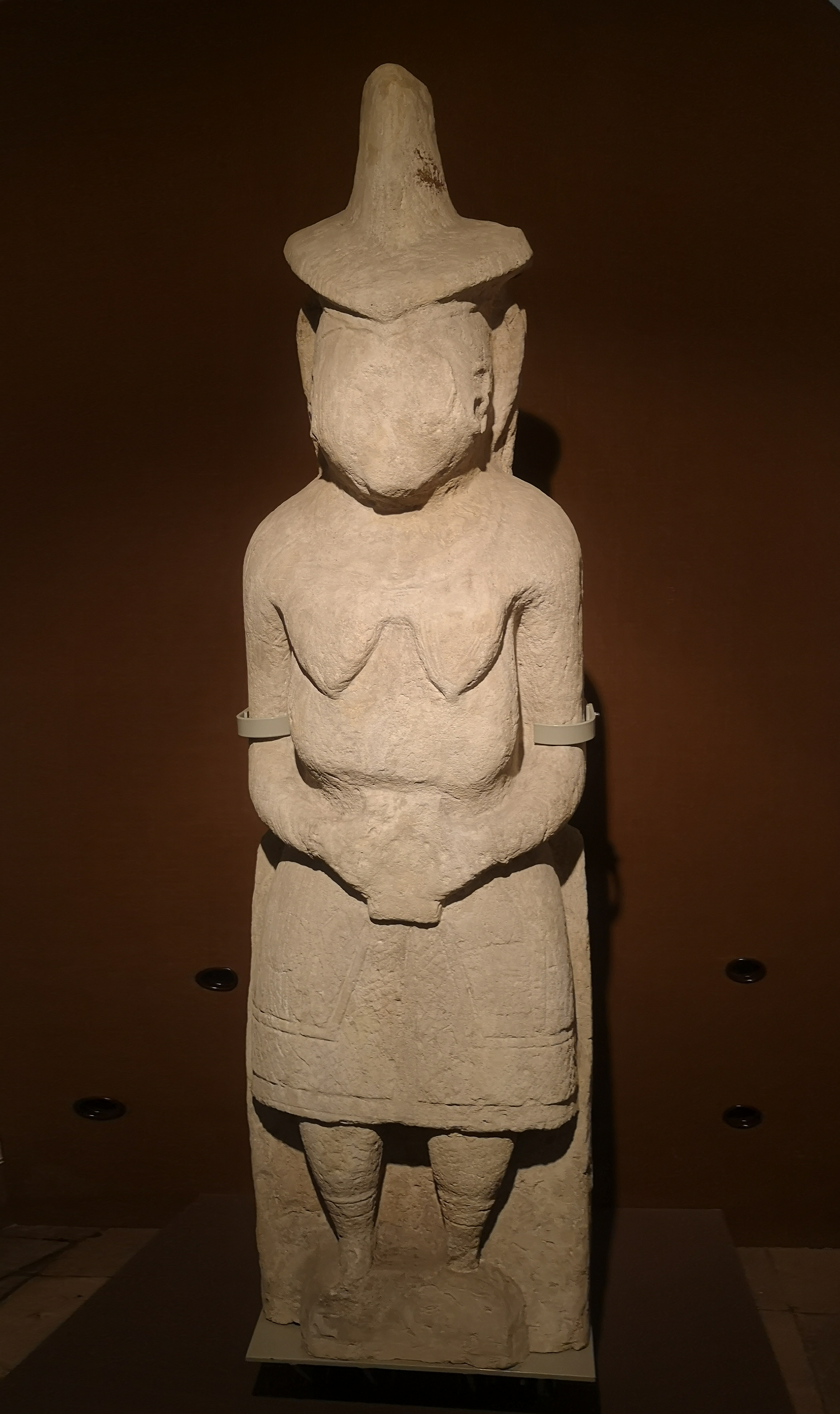
Cuman-Kipchak statue, 12th-13th century, Ukraine

On the Great Hungarian Plain, Cuman settlers gave their name to two regions known as Kunság, the Hungarian word for Cumania: Greater Cumania (Nagykunság) and Little Cumania (Kiskunság), located on the Great Hungarian Plain. Here, the Cumans maintained their language and some ethnic customs well into the modern era.

Cumania's name was also preserved as part of the Catholic ecclesiastical structure with a "Diocese of Cumania" existing until 1523 in what is now Romania, long after the Cumans ceased to be a distinct group in the area. At Milcovul, years earlier, in 1227, the Cuman warlord Bortz accepted Catholic Christianity from missionary Dominican friars. Pope Gregory IX heard about the mass conversion of the Cumans, and on 1 July 1227 empowered Robert, Archbishop of Esztergom, to represent him to Cumania and in the neighbouring Land of the Brodnici. Teodoric, the bishop of this new diocese, became the guardian of the Dominican Order in the Kingdom of Hungary.

Hence, the Cumania diocese became part of the superior archbishopric of Esztergom, determining King Béla IV of Hungary to add "Rex Cumaniae" (King of Cumania) to his titles in 1228, and later to grant asylum to the Cumans in the face of the Mongol invasion. The Diocese of Cumania, or of Milcovul, had subordinated in Transylvania the abbacy of Sibiu, the dioceses of Burzenland, Brasso and Orbai, and over the Carpathians, in the lands of the "infidel" Orthodox Vlachs (in partibus infidelium), all the Christian Catholics, irrespective of their ethnicity, despite the fact that many believers fell under the influence of the Romanian Orthodox "pseudo" bishops (episcopo Cumanorum, qui loci diocesanus existit, sed a quibusdam pseudoepiscopis Graecorum ritum tenentibus).

So, at that moment, Hungarian and Papal documents use the name Cumania to refer to the land between the eastern border of the lands of Seneslau and the land of the Brodnici (Buzău, southern Vrancea and southern Galați): that is Cumania meant, more or less, Muntenia. At that time, the use of the name Cumania should not to be understood as asserting the existence of a Cuman state, nor even a land inhabited by Cuman tribes (as the bulk of them had either fled, or were destroyed by the Mongols, and the rest had been absorbed) but rather to the Diocese of Cumania. From the military point of view, the land comprising the Diocese of Cumania was held either by the Teutonic Order (as early as 1222), or by the Vlachs (Brodnics or the Vlachs of Seneslau). The term Cumania had come to mean any Catholic subordinated to the Milcovul Diocese, so much so that in some cases, the terms Cuman and Wallach (more precisely, Catholic Wallach, as the Orthodox Christians were considered schismatic, and the Pope did not officially recognise them) were interchangeable.

In a charter from 1247, parts of this earlier Cumania were granted to the Knights Hospitaller, as were the Banate of Severin and the Romanian cnezats of Ioan and Lupu (a fluvio Olth et Alpibus Ultrasylvanis totam Cumaniam ...excepta terra Szeneslai Woiavode Olacorum). These, from a juridical point of view, had an inferior status than the states of Seneslau (east of the Olt River) and Litovoi (west of the Olt River), cnezats which continued to belong to the Romanians (quam Olacis relinquimus prout iidem hactenus tenuerant), "like they held them so far".

== See also ==
- Turkic peoples
- Timeline of Turks (500–1300)
- Cuman people
- Pechenegs
- Kipchaks
- Kunság
- Mongol invasion of Europe
- History of Romania
- Crimean Karaites, an ethnic group with possible Cuman origins
- Cuman language

== Bibliography ==
- Istvan Vasary: "Cumans and Tatars", Cambridge University Press, 2005.
- Binder Pál: "Antecedente și consecințe sud-transilvăne ale formării voievodatului Munteniei (sec. XIII-XIV.)" II. Századok, 1995, Budapest.
- Norman Angell: "Peace Theories and the Balkan War"; 1912.
- Golden, Peter B. (2009). "QEPČĀQ". Encyclopaedia Iranica.
