= Branas =

Branas Βρανάς
- Noble family
- Country: Byzantine Empire
- Origin: Adrianople
- Founded: 1047
- Founder: Marianos Branas
- Historic seat: Adrianople
- Members: Alexios Branas
- Connected families: Komnenos dynasty (1166–1187)
- Estates: Adrianople (12th century); Smyrna (13th century)
- Dissolution: 1204

Branas or Vranas (Greek: Βρανάς; feminine form Branaina), was a Byzantine noble family that was active in the 12th century in Adrianople and in the 13th century in Smyrna. Among the notable members were general Alexios Branas (d. 1187) and his son Theodore Branas (d. 1230).

== Origin ==
According to historians the family was either of Slavic or Greek origin. S. Vryonis treated the family as a one of possible Slavic origin. Bulgarian historian Ivan Bozhilov suggested the Slavic vran (врань, "black") as the etymological origin.

== History ==
The first known member was Marianos Branas (1047), who supported Leo Tornikios against emperor Constantine IX Monomachos (r. 1042–1055) in 1047. The ancestral estate was likely around Adrianople, where Alexios Branas was born.

In the 12th century, two notable members were Michael Branas, a sebastos and general under emperor Manuel I Komnenos, who married a Komnene. Michael's son Alexios was a prominent general.

In the 13th century, the Branas family reappeared as land-holders in Smyrna. It was allied to the Palaiologos through Theodore Branas' granddaughter Irene marriage to Constantine, the youngest brother of Michael Palaiologos, in 1259.

== Members ==
- Marianos Branas (1047), supported Leo Tornikios against emperor Constantine IX Monomachos (r. 1042–1055) in 1047.
- Michael Branas, sebastos, general under emperor Manuel I Komnenos, married a Komnene.. Father of Alexios Branas.
- Alexios Branas (fl. 1166–d. 1187), a prominent general, son of sebastos Michael. He decisively defeated the Normans at the Battle of Demetritzes in 1185, and revolted against Isaac II Angelos.
- Theodore Branas (d. c. 1230) son of Alexios, Byzantine archon, then Lord of Adrianople and Caesar in the service of the Latin Empire of Constantinople, and also the third husband of empress Anna/Agnes of Francia.
- Georgios Branas, Byzantine general under emperor Manuel I Komnenos (12th century). Participated in the Byzantine wars against the Hungarians (1164–1168).
- Demetrios Branas, Byzantine admiral and army officer, brother of Georgios Vranas (12th century). He was injured and captured during the Hungarian wars (1164–1168).
- Nikolaos Branas, Byzantine general of the 11th century, mentioned by Anna Komnene in the Alexiad.
- Ioannes Branas, Byzantine general under emperor Andronikos I Komnenos (12th century).

Possible descendants:

- Georgios Vranas (fl. 1483–1499), Greek-born Bishop of Dromore and Bishop of Elphin in Ireland.
- Cortesios Vranas (fl. 1603), Greek Uniate priest and author of De Graecae et Latinae missae consensu (1603) and four epigrams to Alessandro Farnese (cardinal).

== See also ==
- Vranas (surname)
- Vrana (disambiguation)
- List of Byzantine families

== Sources ==
- Angold, Michael (2011). "The Latin Empire of Constantinople". In Herrin, Judith; Saint-Guillain, Guillaume (eds.). Identities and Allegiances in the Eastern Mediterranean After 1204. Ashgate Publishing, Ltd. ISBN 978-1-4094-1098-0.
- Zhekova, Zhenya (2021). "Alexios Komnenos Branas–the last general of the Komnenoi (based to his seals)". Studia Academica Šumenensia. 8: 171–181.
