= Philippe de Toucy =

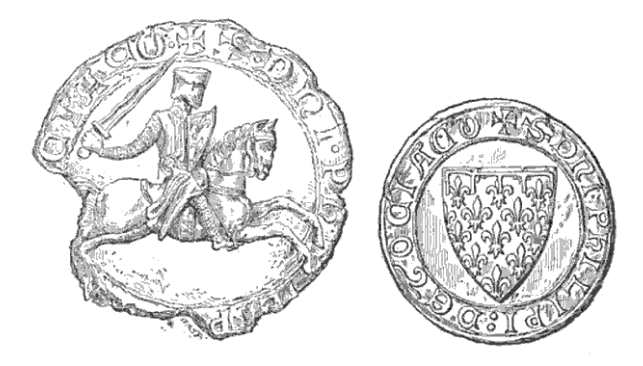
Seal and counterseal. His arms are based on those of France.

Philippe de Toucy (died 12 January 1277) was a French Crusader nobleman and Bailli of the Latin Empire.

Philippe was the son of Narjot de Toucy, a senior lord of the Latin Empire of Constantinople, and a daughter of the Byzantine lord Theodore Branas and Agnes of France, Byzantine empress-dowager and a daughter of Louis VII of France. Like his father before him, Philippe served as regent of the Latin Empire during the absence of Emperor Baldwin II of Constantinople to Western Europe in 1243–1248. Following the recapture of Constantinople by the Greek Empire of Nicaea in 1261, Philippe fled to France, where he apparently joined the entourage of Charles of Anjou; he re-appears as Admiral of the Kingdom of Sicily under Charles in 1273.

From his marriage to Portia de Roye, he had two sons:

- Narjot de Toucy
- Othon de Toucy

== Bibliography ==
- Jean Longnon, "Les Toucy en Orient et en Italie au XIIIe siècle" in Bulletin de La Société des Sciences Historiques et Naturelles de l'Yonne (1953/1956)
- Geanakoplos, Deno John (1953). "Greco-Latin Relations on the Eve of the Byzantine Restoration: The Battle of Pelagonia-1259". Dumbarton Oaks Papers. 7. doi:10.2307/1291057. JSTOR 1291057.
