= Chlemoutsi =

Medieval castle in Elis regional unit, Greece

- Χλεμούτσι Clermont
- Andravida-Kyllini, Western Greece
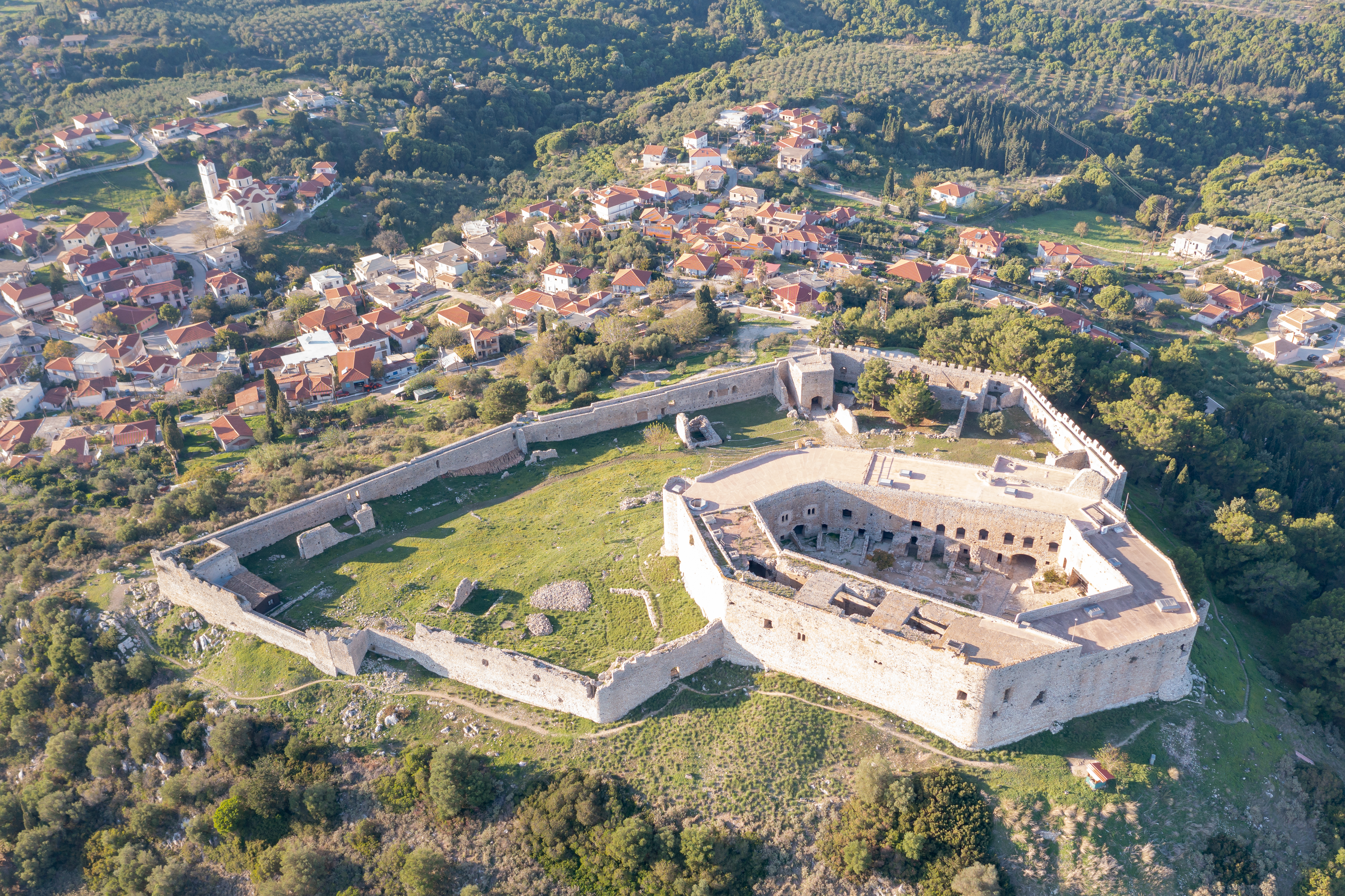
- Aerial view of the castle

Site information
- Type: citadel
- Owner: Greek Ministry of Culture
- Controlled by: Principality of Achaea 1223–1418; Carlo I Tocco 1418–28; Despotate of Morea 1428–60; Ottoman Empire 1460/79–1685; Republic of Venice 1685–1715; Ottoman Empire 1715–1821; Greek rebels 1821–25; Ibrahim Pasha of Egypt c. 1825
- Open to the public: Yes
- Condition: Fairly intact, partial demolition

Location
- Coordinates: 37.8901°N 21.1410°E

Site history
- Built: c. 1220–23
- Built by: Geoffrey I of Villehardouin
- In use: c. 1223 – late 18th century, c. 1821 – 1825
- Materials: hewn stone (ashlar)

Chlemoutsi (Greek: Χλεμούτσι or Χλουμούτσι Chloumoútsi), also known as Clermont, is a medieval castle in the northwest of the Elis regional unit in the Peloponnese peninsula of southern Greece, in the Kastro-Kyllini municipality.

It was built in the early 1220s by the Crusader rulers of the Principality of Achaea as their main stronghold and is perhaps the finest fortification of the early period of Frankish rule in Greece preserved in the country today. The castle is located on a small plateau 226 metres (741 ft) above sea level and comprises a central hexagonal keep built around an inner courtyard and containing two-storeyed halls along its entire length, and complemented by an outer wall enclosing an outer yard on its western side. The castle is largely preserved in its original 13th-century state, with only minor later modifications for the installation of artillery.

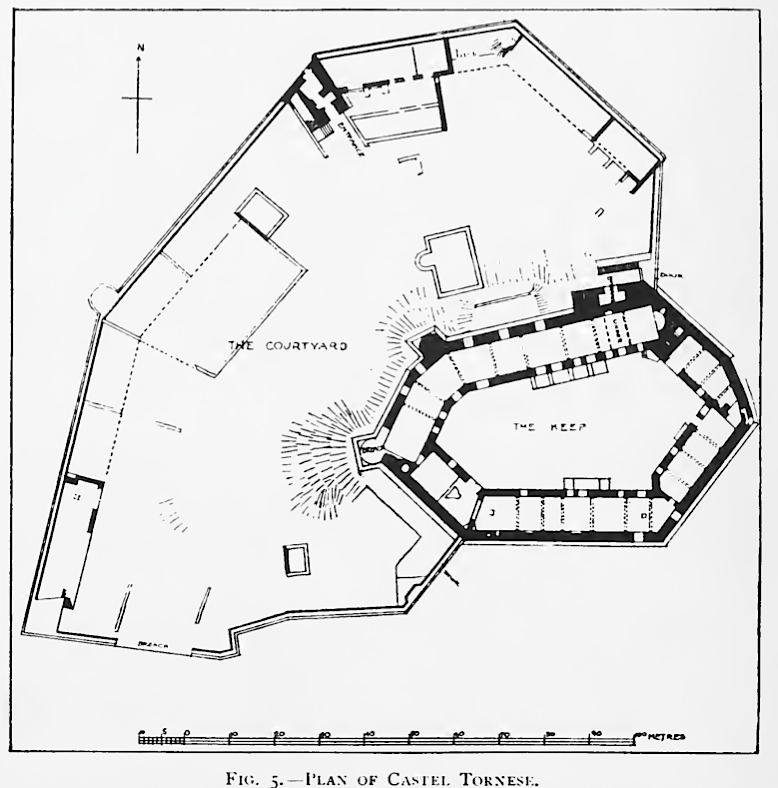
Outline of the castle's layout

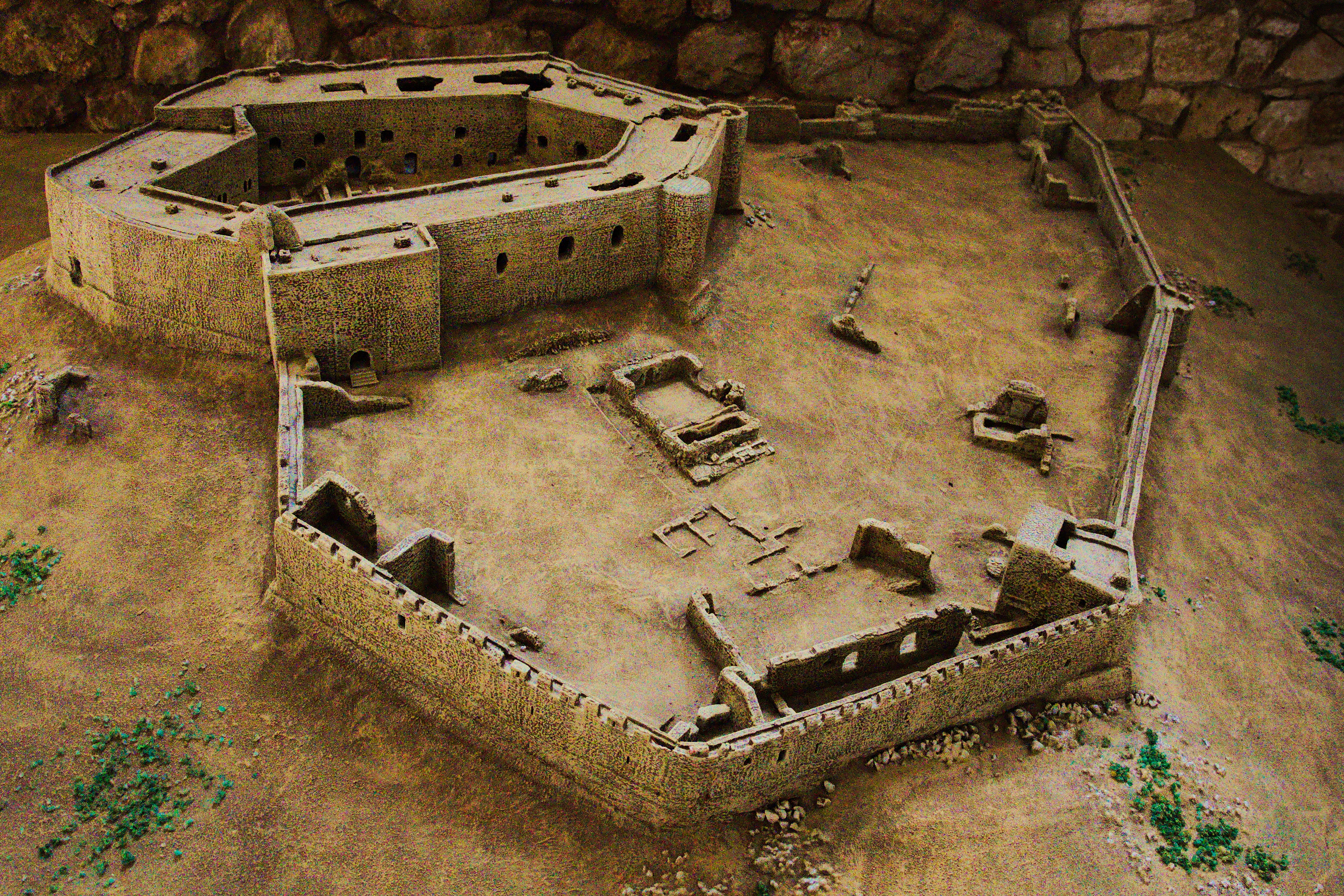
Miniature of the castle

Located near the Principality's capital of Andravida and the chief port of Glarentza, Chlemoutsi played a central role in the Principality's history but was never actually besieged. After coming under Byzantine rule in 1427, it was captured in 1460 by the Ottoman Empire, along with the rest of the Byzantine Despotate of the Morea. In Ottoman times, minor additions were made to provide platforms for artillery, but the castle progressively lost its significance and was completely deserted by the late 18th century. In 1825, during the Greek War of Independence, part of its outer wall was demolished to prevent the Greek rebels from using it. Today it is a preserved monument open to the public.

== History ==
The castle was built between 1220 and 1223, during the rule of the Prince of Achaea Geoffrey I of Villehardouin, as a result of a dispute between the Prince and the clergy of the Principality. Geoffrey had asked the clergy, which owned almost a third of the Principality's lands but was not obliged to render military service, for additional donations to help defend the realm. When the clergy refused, claiming that they owed allegiance only to the Pope, Geoffrey confiscated Church property, and began construction of Chlemoutsi with the new funds. The fortress was set on a new foundation, with no previous structure identifiable on this site. Its French name, Clairmont or Clermont, most probably gave rise to the Greek form of Chlo[u]moutsi, which more recently became Chlemoutsi, although various theories have been proposed as to the name's origin, with suggestions of Greek, Albanian or Slavic roots pre-dating the Frankish fortress. From the 15th century, Italian sources came to call it Castel Tornese, apparently through a confusion with the seat of the Principality's mint in nearby Glarentza, which until the middle of the 14th century minted silver tornese coins.

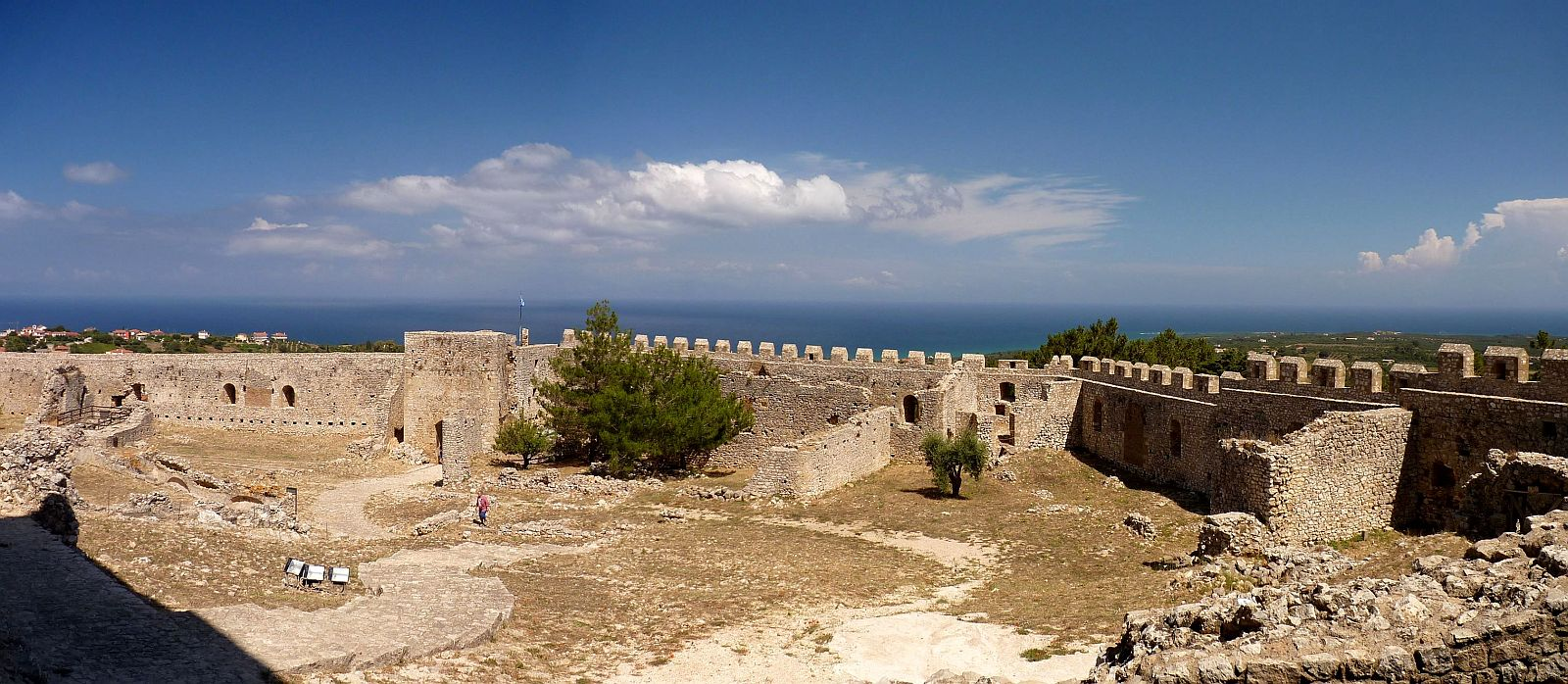
Inside view of the castle's walls

The new fortress was near the princely capital of Andravida, some 13 kilometres (8 mi) away, and ca. 5 kilometres (3 mi) from the Principality's largest port and town, Glarentza. These three sites were the administrative heart of the Principality and, along with the fortress of Beauvoir or Pontiko at Katakolo further south, served to secure control of the fertile plain of Elis, which formed a major part of the princely domain (along with Corinthia and the Evrotas Valley in Laconia). Despite its importance, however, throughout the history of the Principality of Achaea Chlemoutsi was never the object of major military operations; rather, its main function seems to have been as a prison for distinguished captives, such as the Byzantine generals taken captive at the Battle of Makryplagi in c. 1263, one of whom, Alexios Philes, died in captivity there.

Map of the Peloponnese with its principal locations during the late Middle Ages. Chlemoutsi is located on the westernmost promontory of the peninsula.

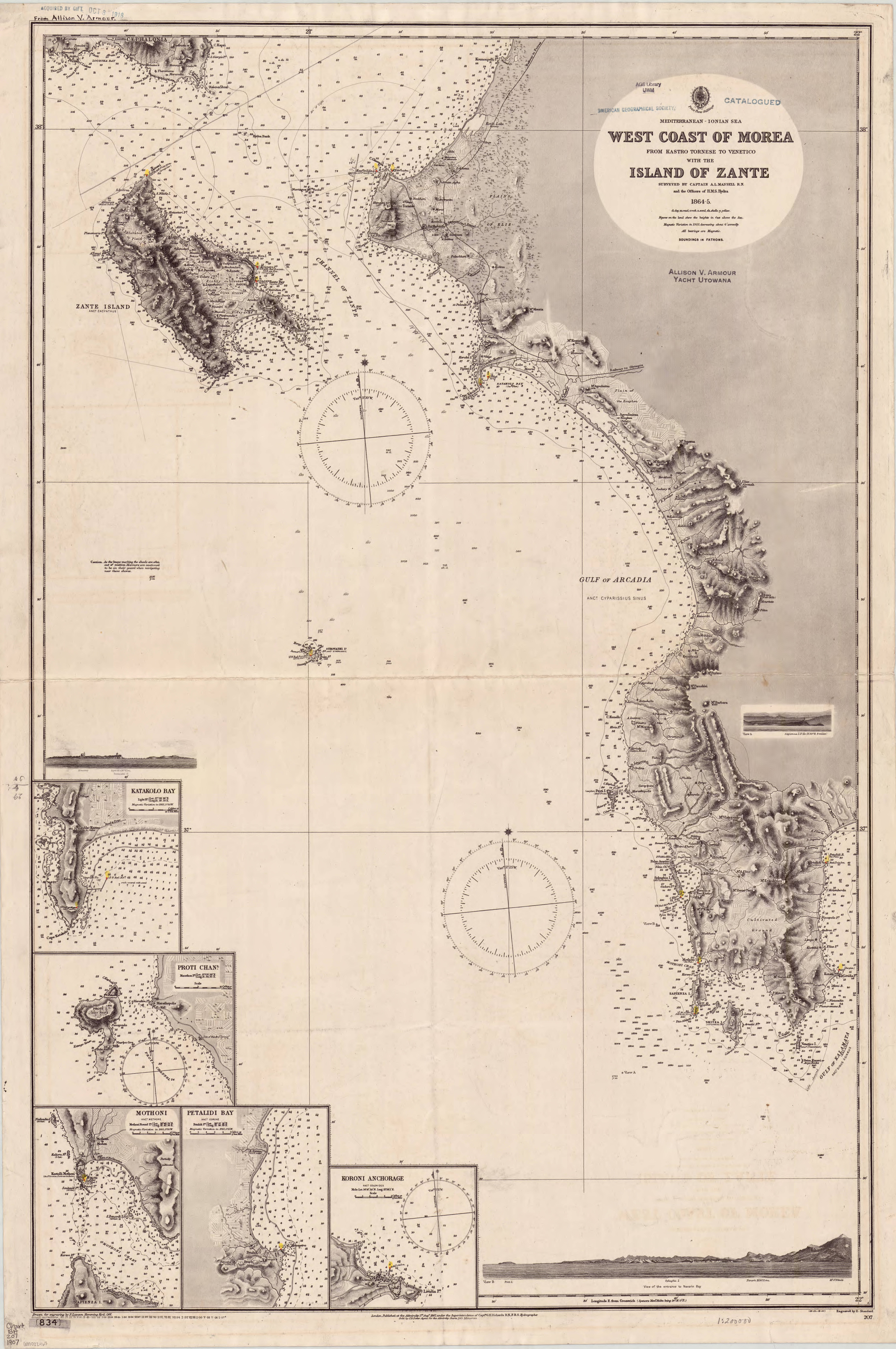
Nautical chart of the west coast of the Peloponnese from 1867. Chlemoutsi is located near the top.

When the Prince William II of Villehardouin died in 1278, the princely domain, as well as the princely title, went to the King of Naples, Charles of Anjou, according to the provisions of the Treaty of Viterbo. Chlemoutsi, however, had been granted by William to his wife, Anna Komnene Doukaina, who retained it, along with the Villehardouins' hereditary Barony of Kalamata in Messenia. In 1280, Anna married the baron Nicholas II of Saint Omer, lord of one half of Thebes. The latter's acquisition of some of the "most fertile lands and the most powerful fortress in the Morea", in the words of the French medievalist Antoine Bon, in addition to the wealth he had inherited from his first marriage, worried King Charles. On 25 September 1281, an agreement was reached whereby Chlemoutsi and Kalamata were ceded to the princely domain in exchange for half the lands of the recently deceased Leonard of Veroli, comprising estates in both the Morea (in Elis and Messenia) and Italy. In the early 1290s, Thomas Komnenos Doukas, son and successor of the Despot of Epirus Nikephoros I Komnenos Doukas, was held at Chlemoutsi as a hostage for his father's behaviour.

In c. 1311, the sole surviving daughter of William II Villehardouin, Margaret, sought, by virtue of her descent, to claim the Principality, or at least a portion of it, including Chlemoutsi and Kalamata, from the Angevin Kings of Naples who had controlled it since 1278. To this end, in February 1314, she wedded her only daughter, Isabel of Sabran, to Ferdinand of Majorca and passed her titles and claims to them. She then returned to Achaea, where she was imprisoned by the Angevin bailli at Chlemoutsi, where she died in February or March 1315. Ferdinand landed at Glarentza in June 1315, claiming the Principality from the Angevin nominee, Louis of Burgundy. Chlemoutsi and most of Elis fell rapidly under Ferdinand's control, but he was eventually defeated and killed in the Battle of Manolada in July 1316. The remaining Majorcan troops ceded the fortresses they held in Elis and set sail for home shortly after.

In 1418, Glarentza and Chlemoutsi passed into the hands of Carlo I Tocco, who began to expand his territories in the Morea at the expense of Prince Centurione II Zaccaria. After his defeat by the Byzantine navy in the 1427 Battle of the Echinades, however, Tocco was forced to cede his possessions to the Despot of the Morea, Constantine Palaiologos (who would become the last Byzantine emperor), in the form of a dowry for his daughter Maddalena Tocco. Chlemoutsi now became Constantine's residence and his base of operations against the last major Latin stronghold, the city of Patras, in 1428–30. The castle remained in Byzantine hands until it was captured, along with the rest of the Morea, by the Ottoman Empire in 1460. The bastard son of Centurione II, John Asen Zaccaria, was also imprisoned at Chlemoutsi, but managed to escape in 1453 and lead a rebellion against the Byzantine Despots of the Morea.

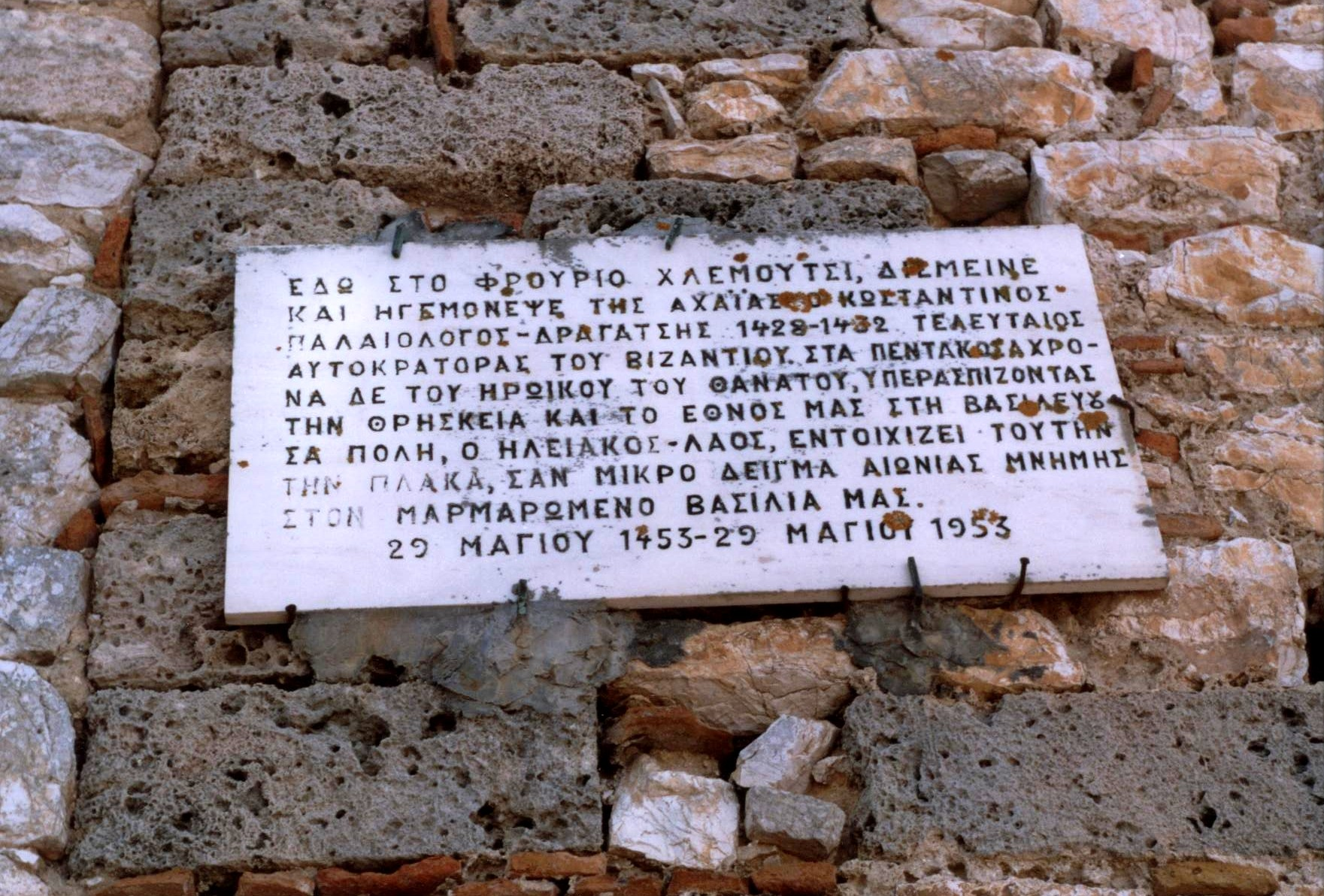
Modern plaque inside the castle which commemorates Constantine XI's rule over Achaea

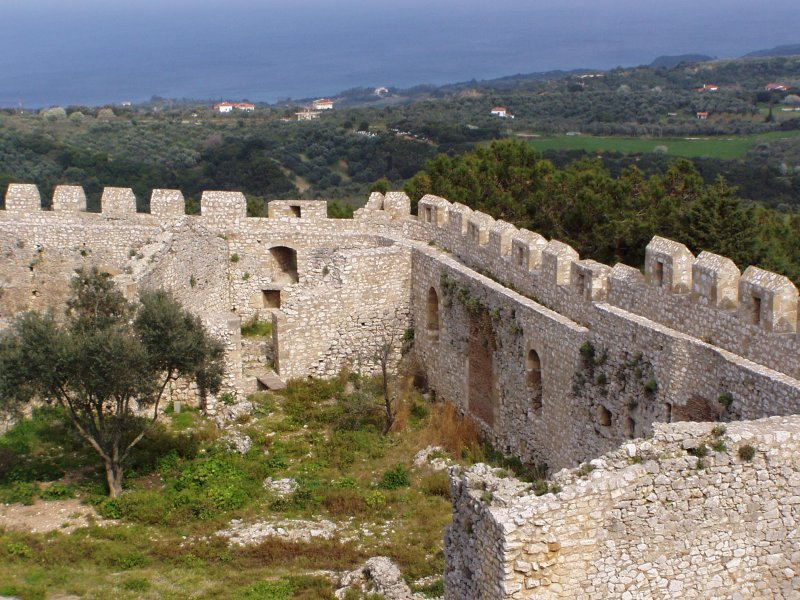
The walls of Chlemoutsi

With the Ottoman conquest, the castle lost much of its strategic significance. However, it was occupied by the Venetians during the Ottoman–Venetian War of 1463–79, and attacked by the Knights of Malta in 1620. During the period of Venetian rule in the Peloponnese (1687–1715) after the Morean War, it served as the seat of a fiscal district. Moreover, the reports of the Venetian governors at the time dismiss Chlemoutsi as small in size and barely inhabited. In 1701 the provveditore generale Francesco Grimani proposed that it be destroyed, as it was too far from the sea—a vital concern for the maritime-minded Republic—and difficult to defend, and recommended that Glarentza, by then abandoned and ruined, be rebuilt instead. In 1715, the Morea returned to Ottoman control, and by the early 19th century, the fortress had been completely deserted.

In 1821, Konstantinos Andravidiotis defeated the Ottoman forces in Elis, after which they retreated inside Chlemoutsi. Thus begun the unsuccessful Siege of Chlemoutsi under Georgios Sisinis and Charalambos Vilaetis, which was lifted after Ottoman forces from Lalas counterattacked. In 1825, the forces of Ibrahim Pasha of Egypt took the castle and dismantled a portion of its walls so that it could not be used by the Greek rebels.

Today the castle is a preserved landmark under the 6th Ephorate of Byzantine Antiquities. It can be visited and is easily accessible by car from nearby Kyllini.

== Location and architecture ==
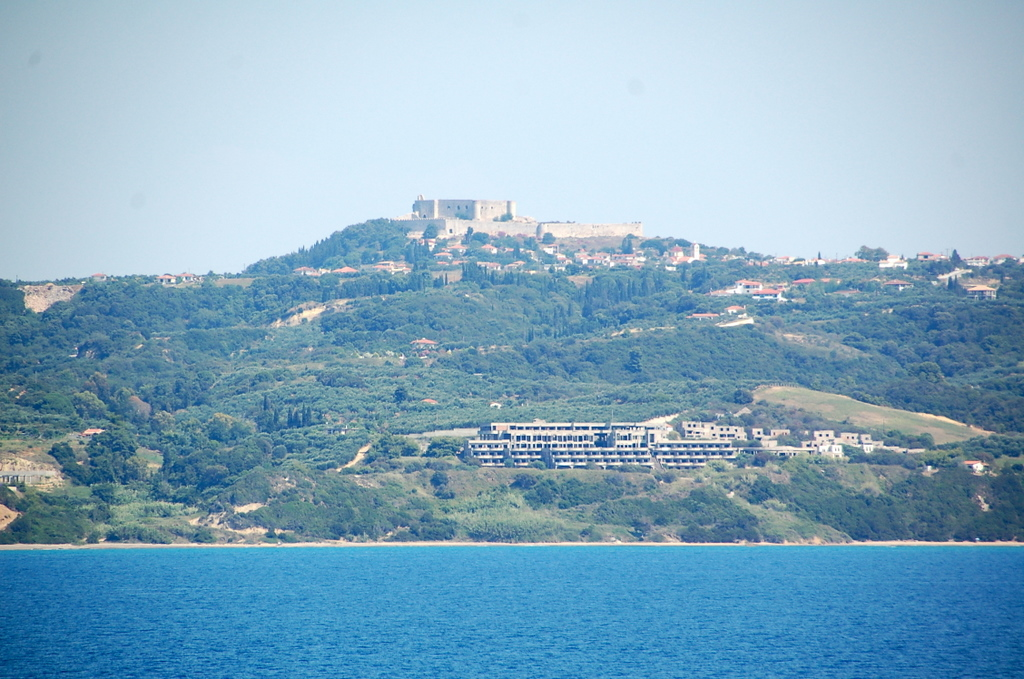
Chlemoutsi as seen from the Ionian Sea.

Chlemoutsi remains "the most beautiful testimony of the military art in the Frankish principality", according to A. Bon. Its location, on a small plateau of 226 metres (741 ft) above sea level near the modern village of Kastro-Kyllini, gives it a commanding view of the surrounding countryside, encompassing the coastal plain of Elis and reaching to the Ionian Islands of Zakynthos and Cephalonia and even to the coast of Aetolia-Acarnania on the Greek mainland. The view from this location and the scale and quality of its construction prove, according to A. Bon, that Chlemoutsi was not built as a citadel for Glarentza, but that it fulfilled an independent military role, that of securing control over the wider region.

The castle is located on the top of an irregular plateau, whose southern, eastern and northern slopes are abrupt, with the softer western slope, towards the modern village of Kastro, offering the easiest access. The heart of the fortress consists of a large hexagonal keep, complemented towards the west, where the terrain is more accessible, by an additional outer wall, likewise of irregular polygonal outline, enclosing a second, much wider courtyard (the outer ward).

=== Outer ward ===
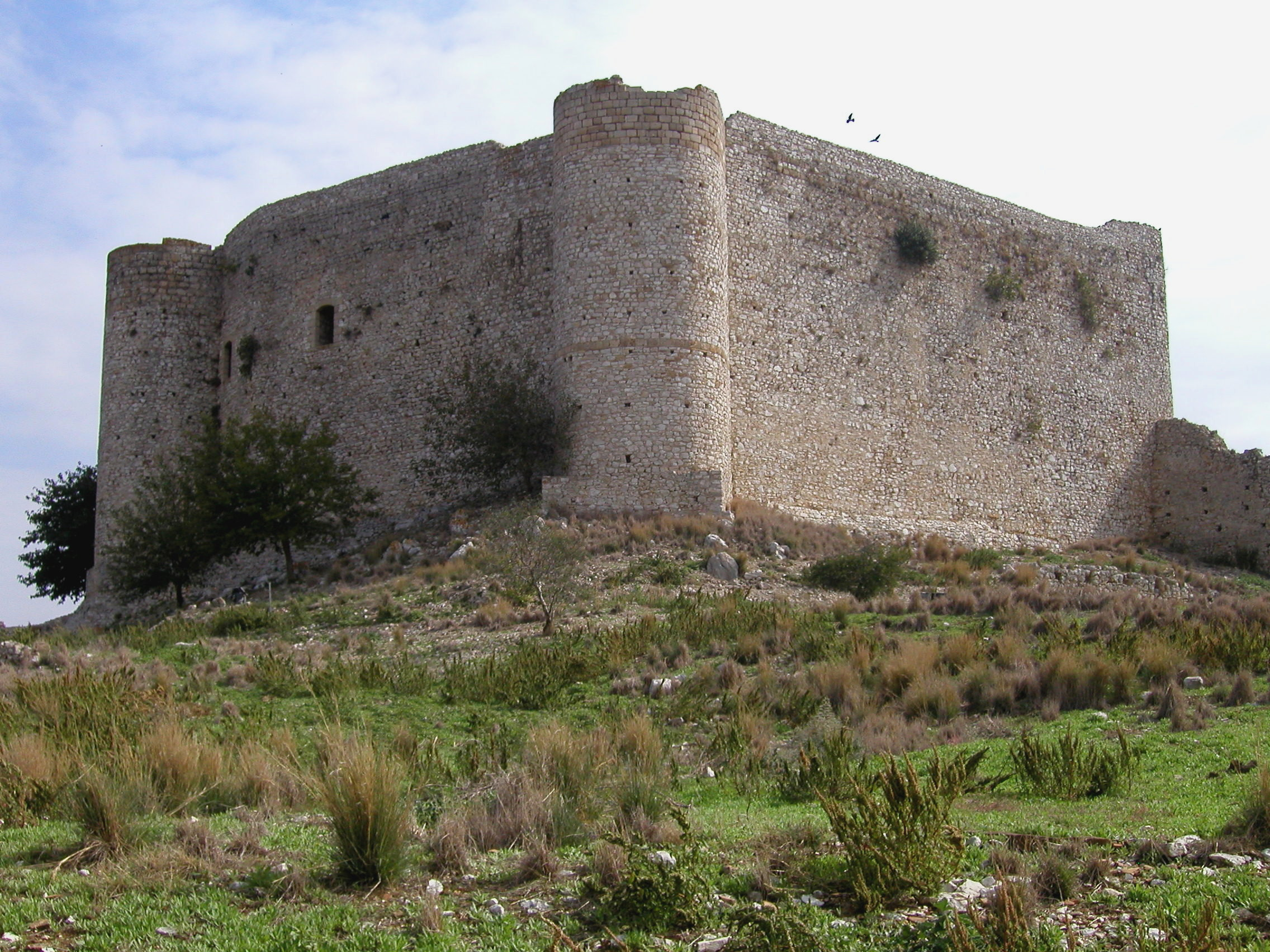
The keep seen from the southern outer ward

The outer gate of the fortress lies in the northwestern side of the outer ward, originally within a small recess in the outer curtain wall, protected by a portcullis. The Turks later filled the recess with a smaller set of walls to preserve unbroken the outer wall's frontage. The Ottomans also added additional buttresses to the junctions of their wall with the original curtain wall. In contrast, the space between the original gate and the new Ottoman entrance was left unroofed and open to the sky. From the gate, the outer wall continues east and then south, in three distinct stretches of walls, to the keep. The wall is built of limestone masonry, with little evidence of brick or tiles, topped by a small inner parapet and Ottoman-built crenellations, now largely ruined. From the beginning, buildings were built leaning on the outer wall, as evidenced by the remnant of their foundations, side walls joining the curtain wall's inner face, or the presence of fireplaces and lancet windows in the curtain wall. One of these buildings is largely preserved immediately next to the outer gate. Windows, fireplaces etc. display a uniformity of style that points to their construction at the same time as the fortress itself. At the point where the outer wall joins the keep, a small postern is located, as well as a stairway leading up to the outer wall's chemin de ronde.

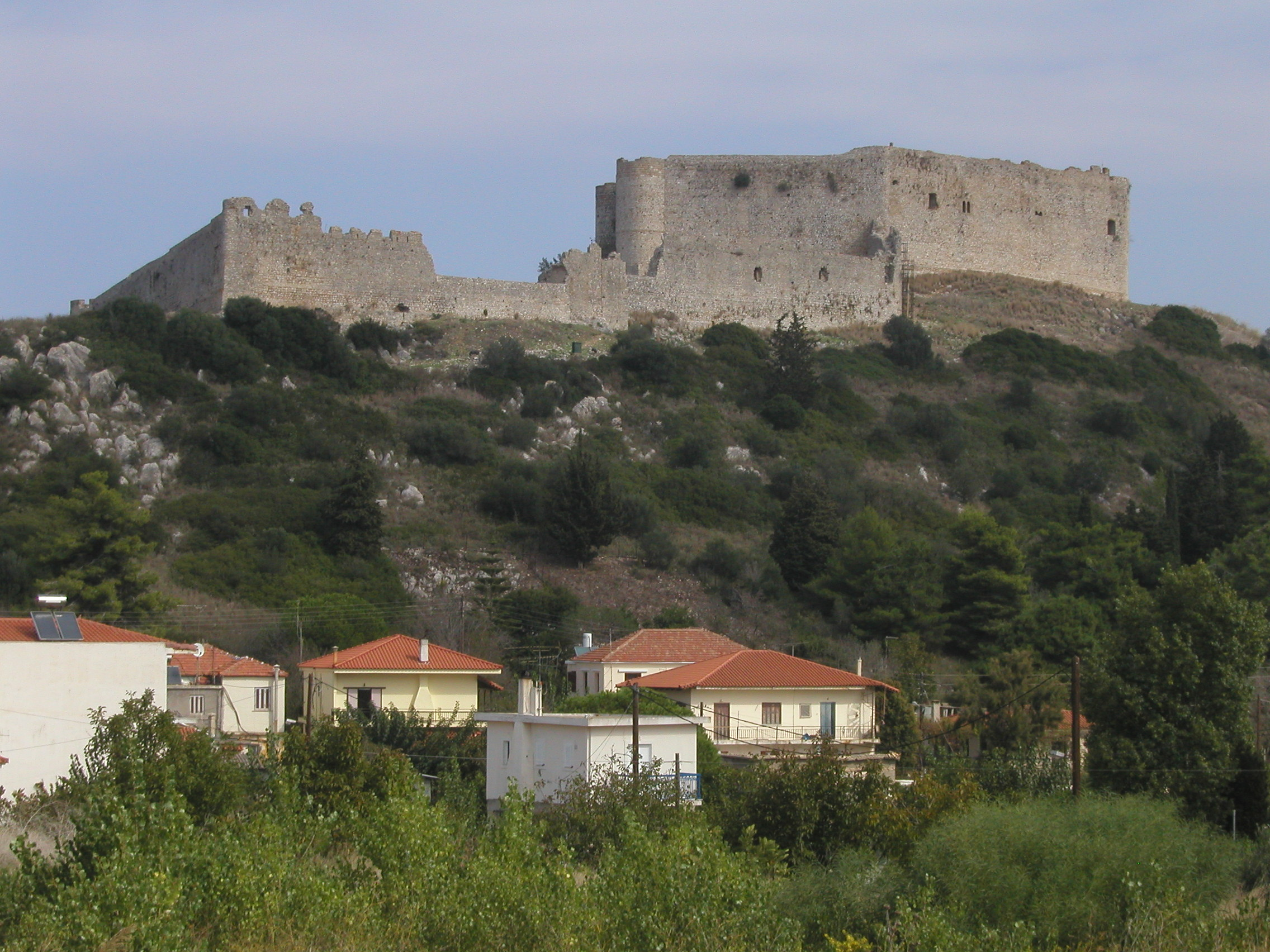
View of Chlemoutsi from the south, showing the portion of the outer wall destroyed by Ibrahim Pasha in 1825

On the other side of the gate, the curtain wall continues in two stretches southwest and south, with a tower—probably an Ottoman addition—at their junction, before turning sharply to the east. The Turks built a terrepleined bastion behind this southwestern corner as an artillery platform. There is evidence of buildings erected adjoining the curtain wall along the western wall. The southern wall shows evidence of later, probably Turkish, repairs, with broken tiles alternating with stone courses. In this stretch, Ibrahim Pasha's cannons affected the wall's breach in 1825. Roughly halfway between the southwestern corner and the keep, the wall abruptly turns inwards for about 5 metres (16 ft) around an Ottoman-built tower before continuing east and then northeast to join the keep. Another postern is located about 10 metres (33 ft) from the junction of the two walls.

=== Keep ===
The keep is of an irregular hexagonal shape, measuring some 90 metres (300 ft) from east to west and c. 60 metres (200 ft) from south to north, with its six walls enclosing an inner courtyard of 61 by 31 metres (200 ft × 102 ft). Its walls hold a series of two-storeyed halls, forming a ring of rooms around the central courtyard. The lower storey, separated from the upper by wooden floors—now mostly collapsed with only the niches for the support of beams testifying to their existence—has arches opening into the courtyard. The upper storey features large galleries with ovoid barrel vaults "of immaculate poros ashlar" (Andrews), supported by side walls of limestone blocks and by regularly spaced transverse arches every 7–10 metres (23–33 ft). These have collapsed except for the pilasters, set into the wall and topped by Byzantine-style chamfered imposts.

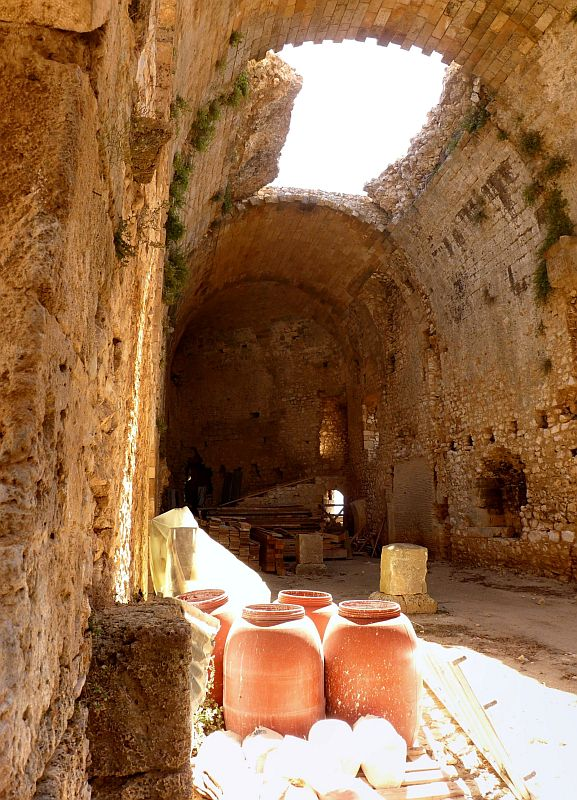
One of the vaulted galleries in the keep

The galleries feature mostly a uniform style—common in 12th-century French architecture—of double-arched windows set within a vaulted depression in the walls, with banquettes on either side. The galleries also feature niches and fireplaces similar to those of the outer curtain wall and the associated buildings, reinforcing the "stylistic uniformity" (Andrews) of the castle. Chlemoutsi was well suited for a princely residence: its halls, arranged around the inner courtyard, were spacious, comfortable, and well-lit, cool in the summer and provided with several fireplaces for the winter months.

The entrance to the keep was located in an avant-corps on the northern side, with a vaulted passageway between two gates leading from the outer courtyard to the inner rooms of the keep. The keep itself features just two round towers of 5 m diameter with square bases, both located on the western side and within the outer ward. The more southern of the two is almost totally ruined, probably as a result of Ibrahim Pasha's destruction. The more exposed eastern and southern sides featured no towers. According to the historian Kevin Andrews, this is perhaps because they were judged to be adequately protected by the steep terrain.

The roof of the keep appears to have originally been sloping or gable-shaped, with a chemin de ronde and parapet on its outer face, but was later rebuilt with the outer wall raised and the roof replaced by the current, platform-like terrace. Access to the roof is given via a staircase from the courtyard, immediately next to the main entrance into the keep, and by a spiral staircase, now collapsed, in the western corner. The inner parapet of the new roof survives, but few traces of the outer parapet remain, except for a few Ottoman-era merlons. No provision appears to have been made for the installation of guns here.

=== Architecture and importance ===
Judging by the relative uniformity of construction, the castle of Chlemoutsi appears to have been built within a few years, c. 1220–23. Most of the architectural elements found in the castle are typical of French 12th-century architecture; as K. Andrews writes, "lacking purely Gothic features, it appears to be more a transition from the Romanesque". A few native Byzantine elements are also apparent, as in the impost blocks or in the use of local material.

Chlemoutsi remains "one of the most important and best-preserved castles in Greece" (A. Ralli), and maintains its Frankish character intact. After the Frankish period and the decline of its military importance, occupiers made few additions or alterations; the Byzantine rule left no traces, and only the Ottomans made some minor repairs and modifications for artillery.

== Gallery ==
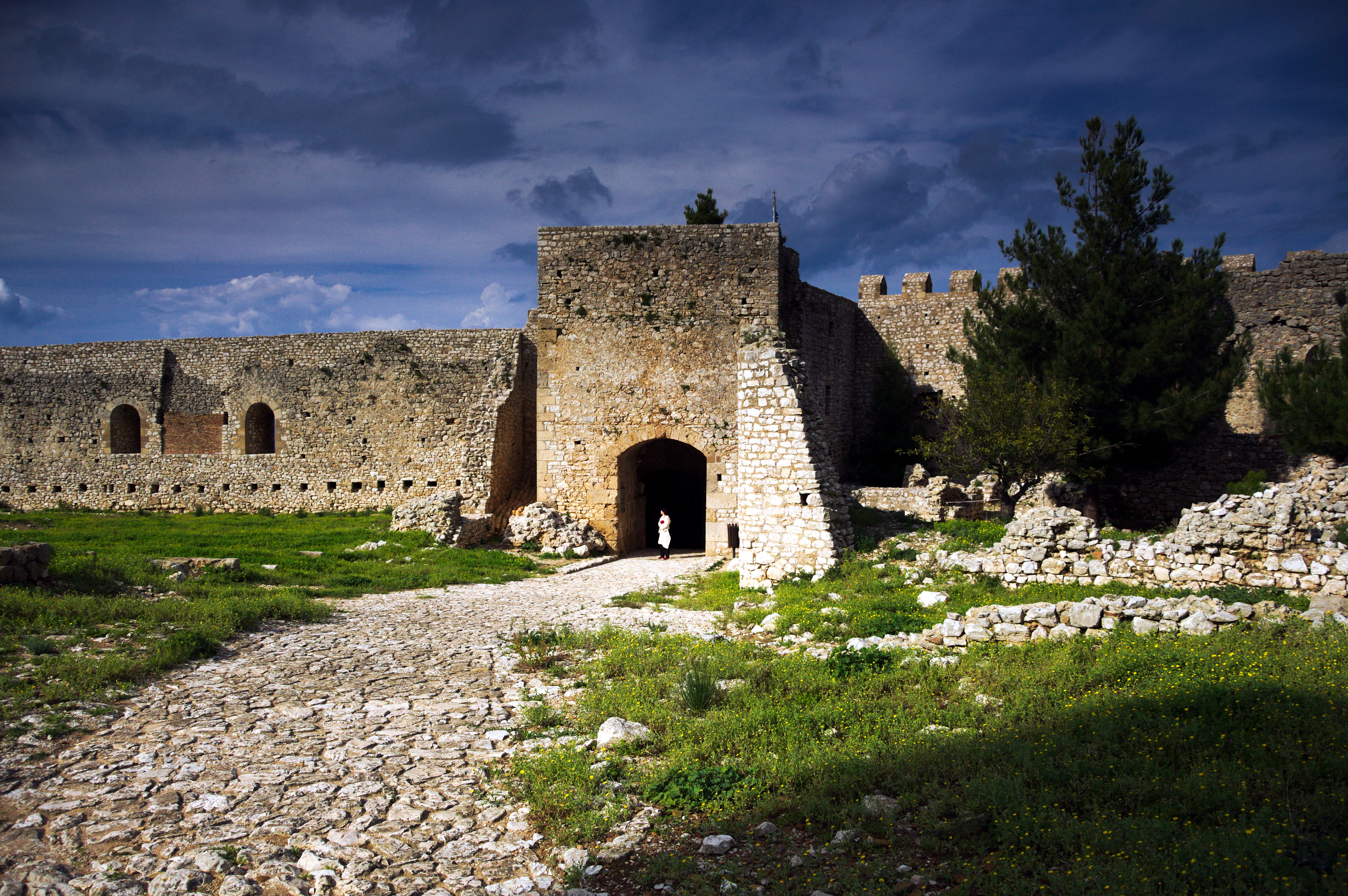

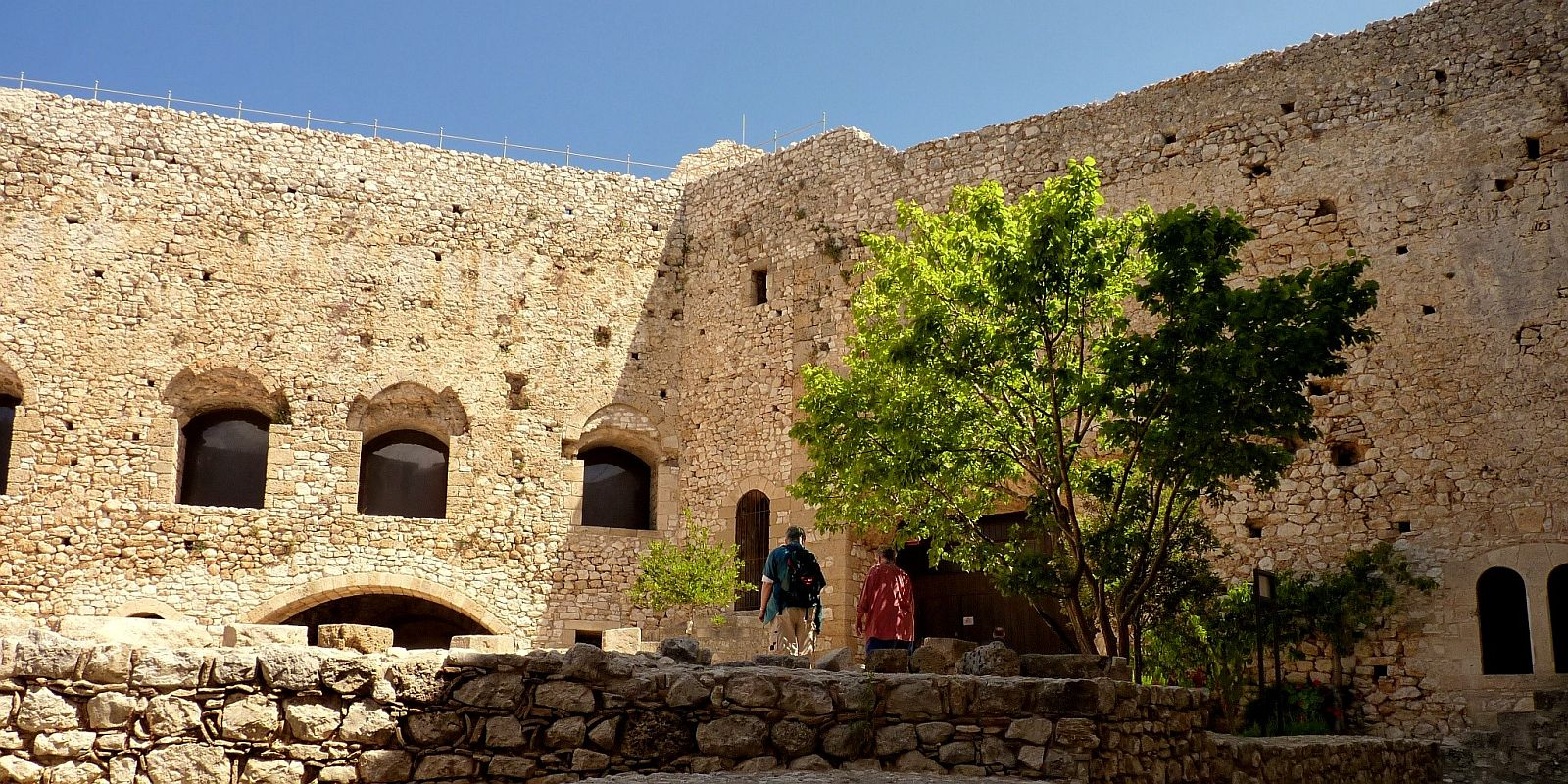

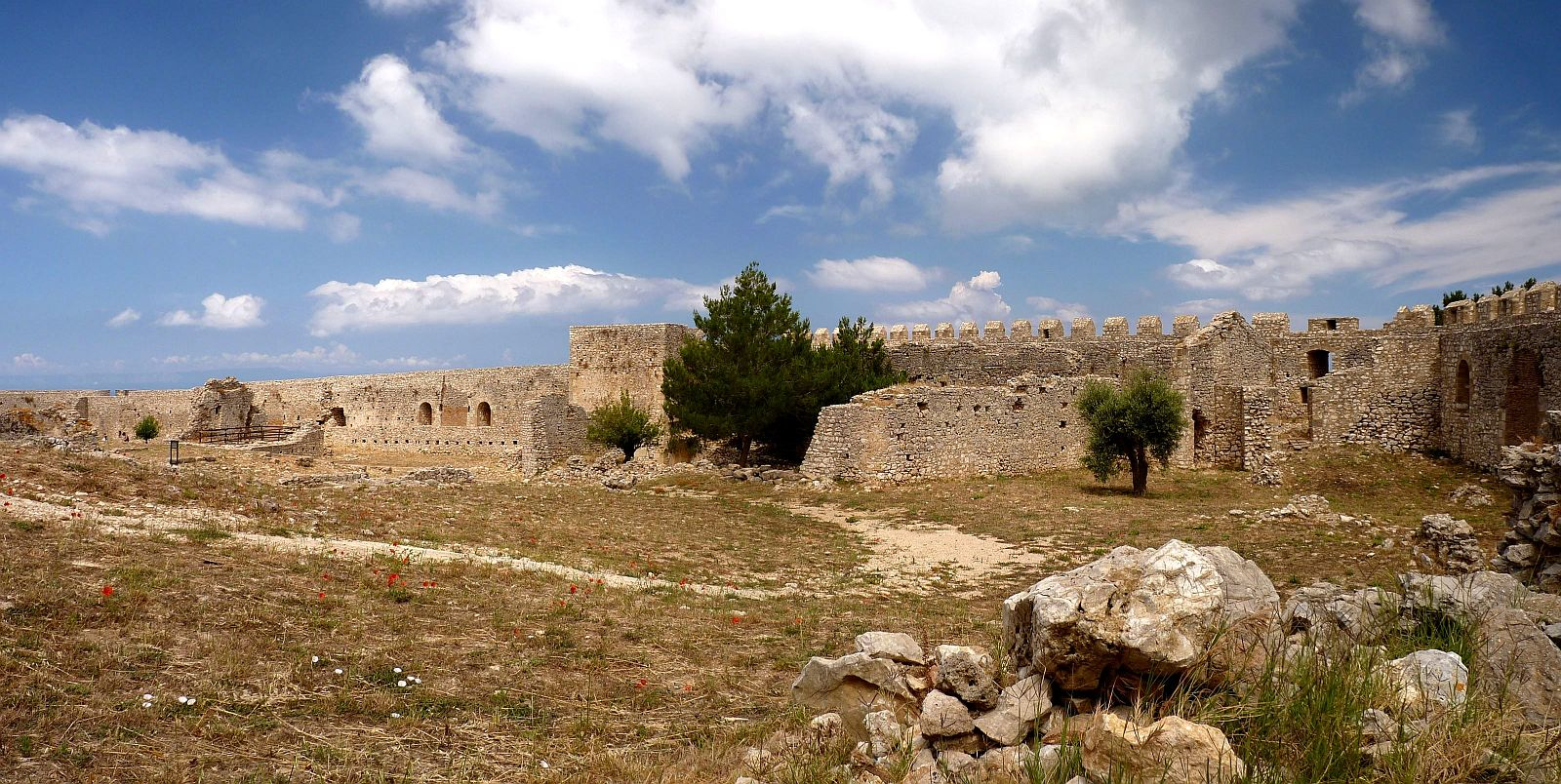

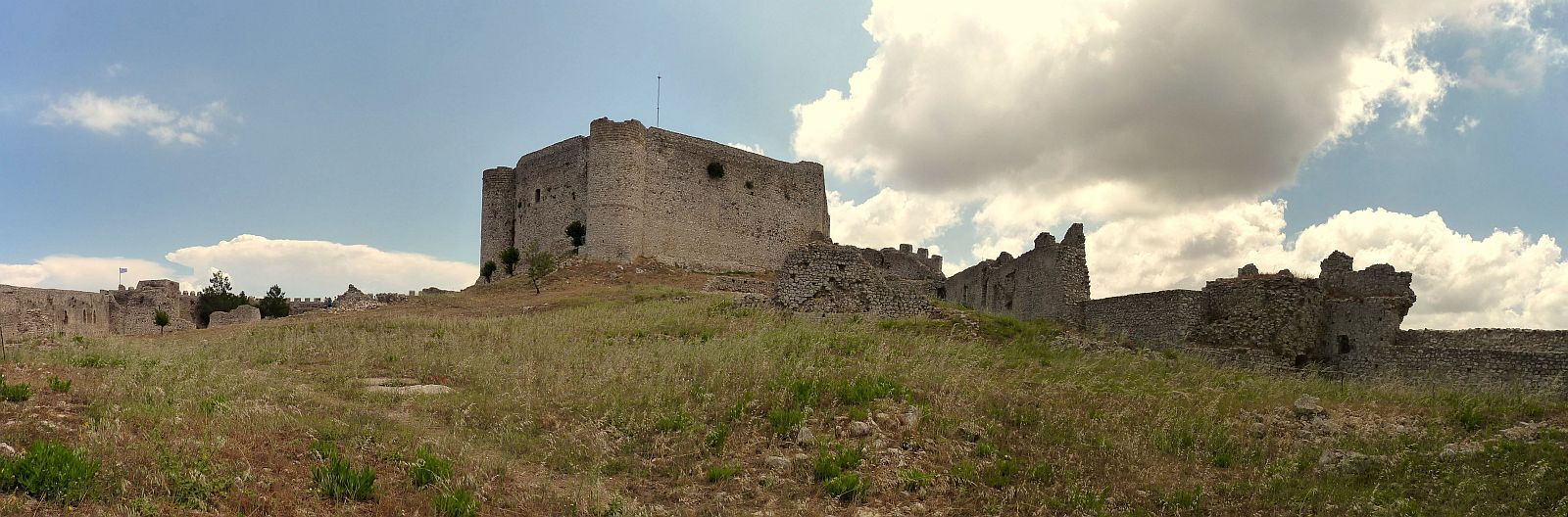

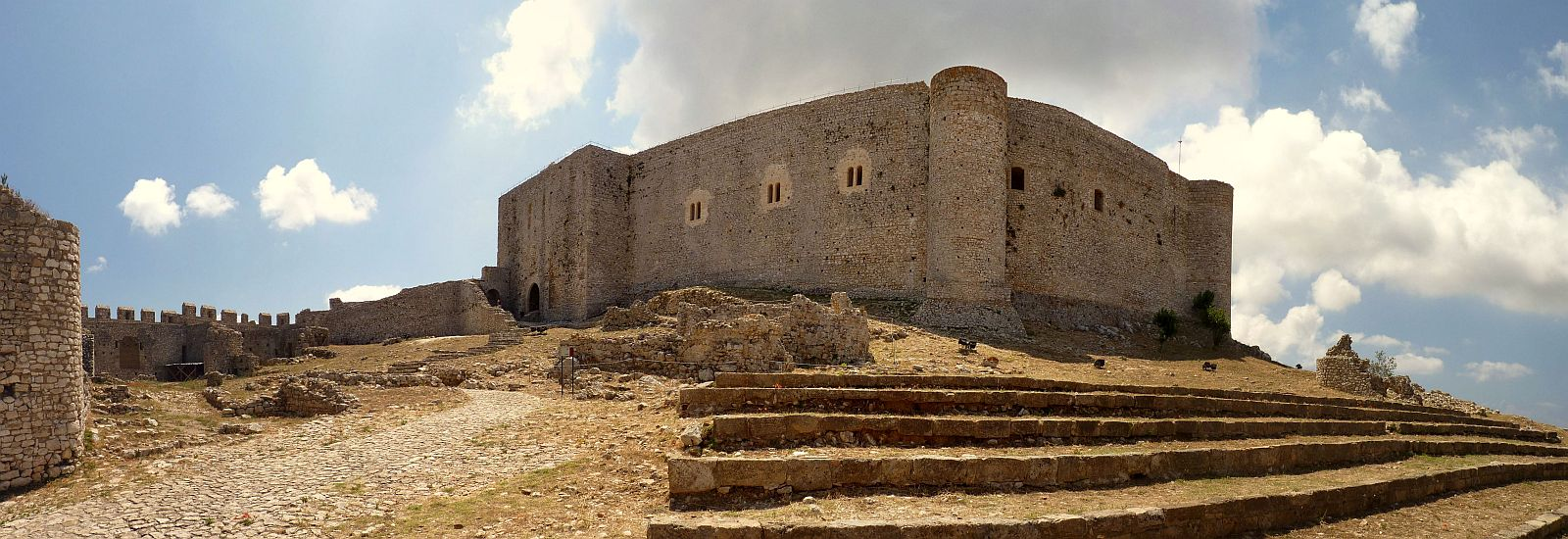

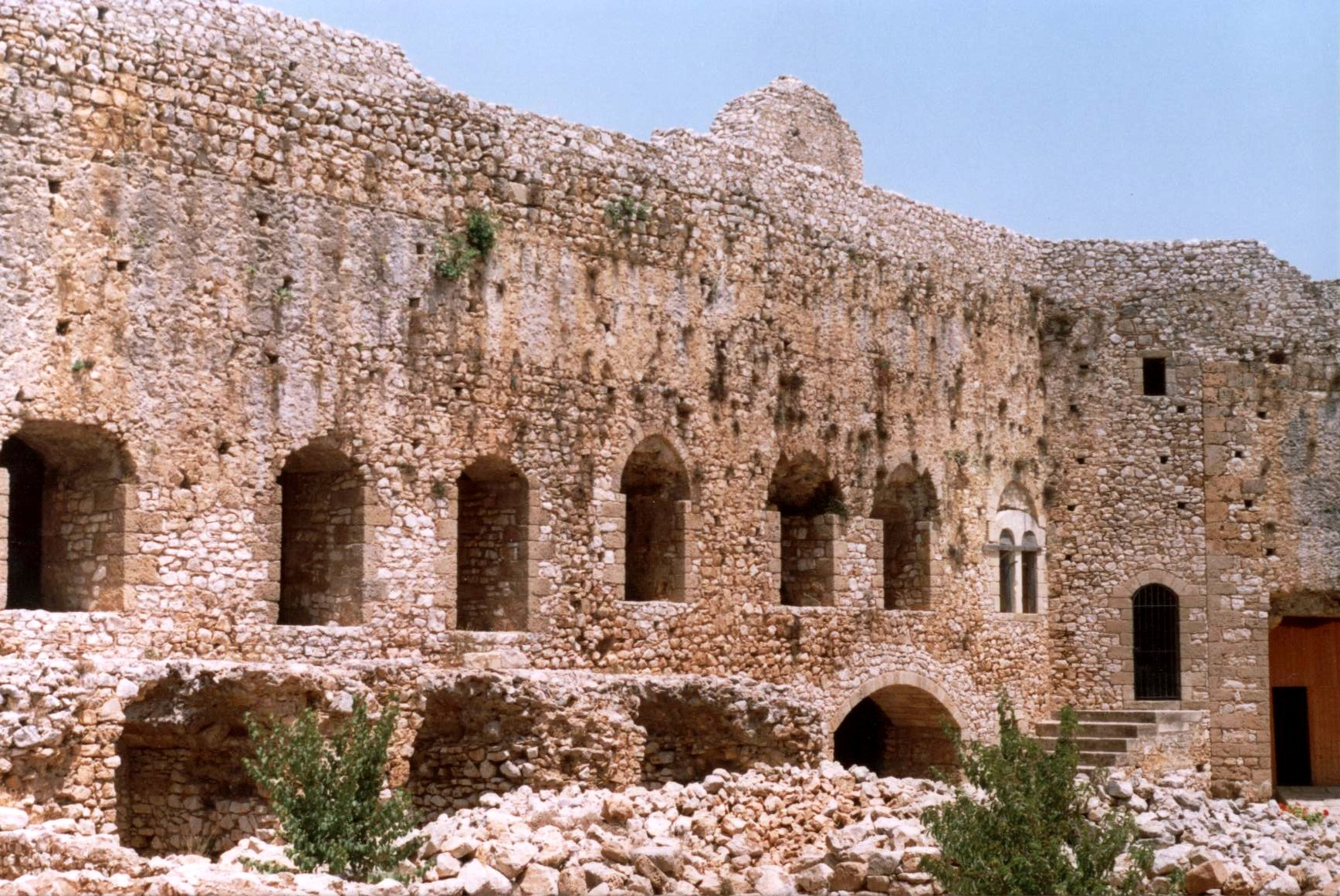

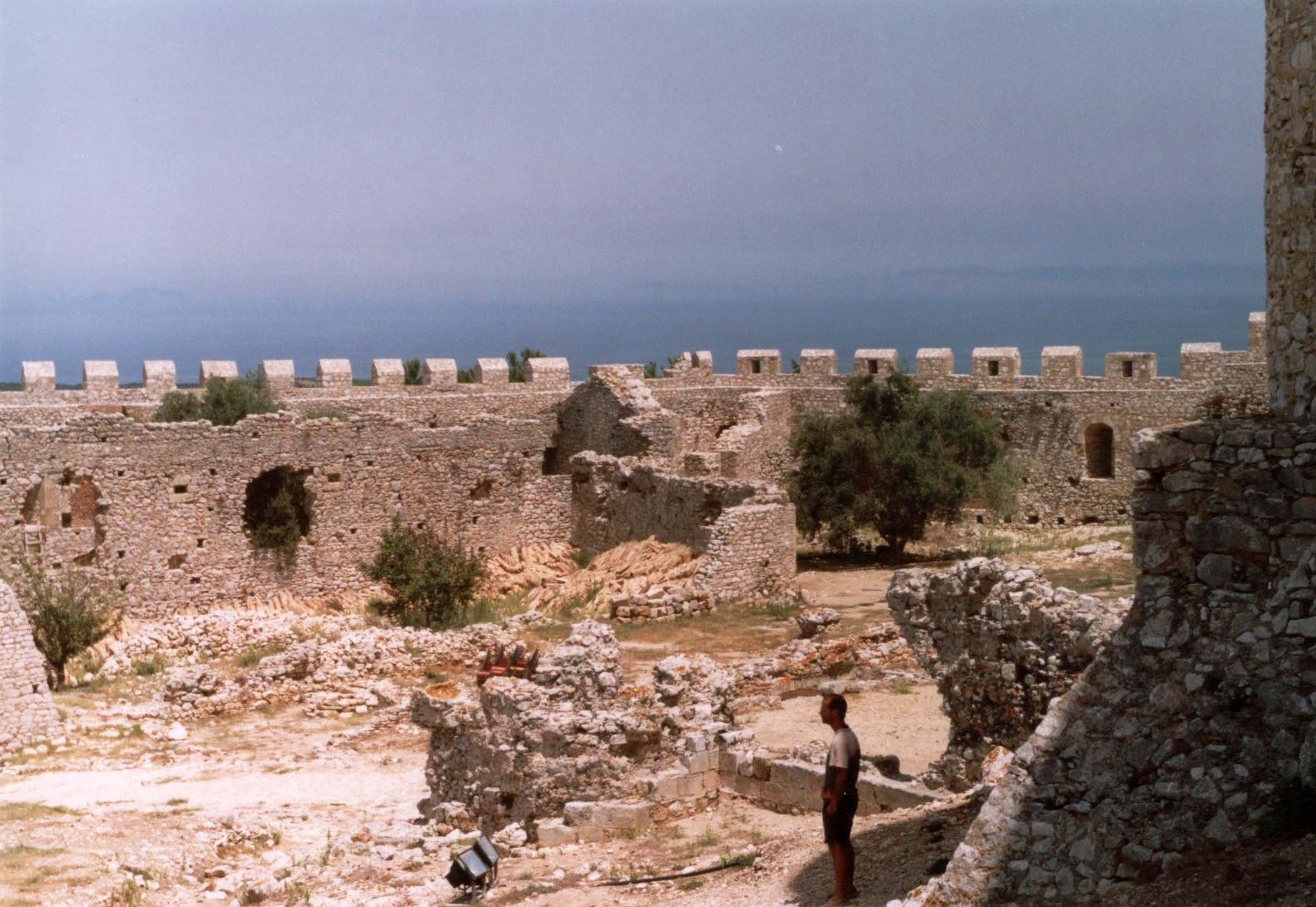

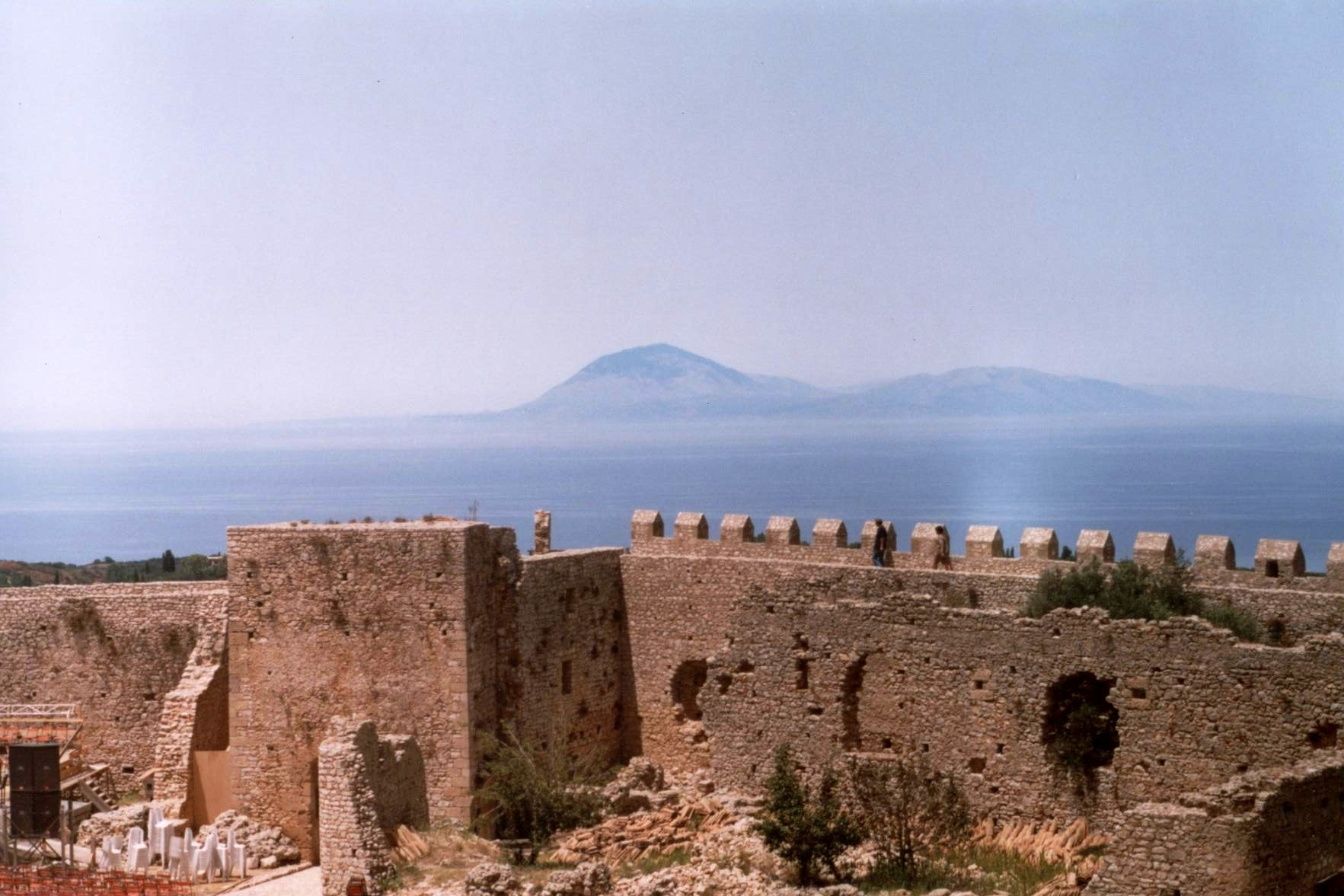

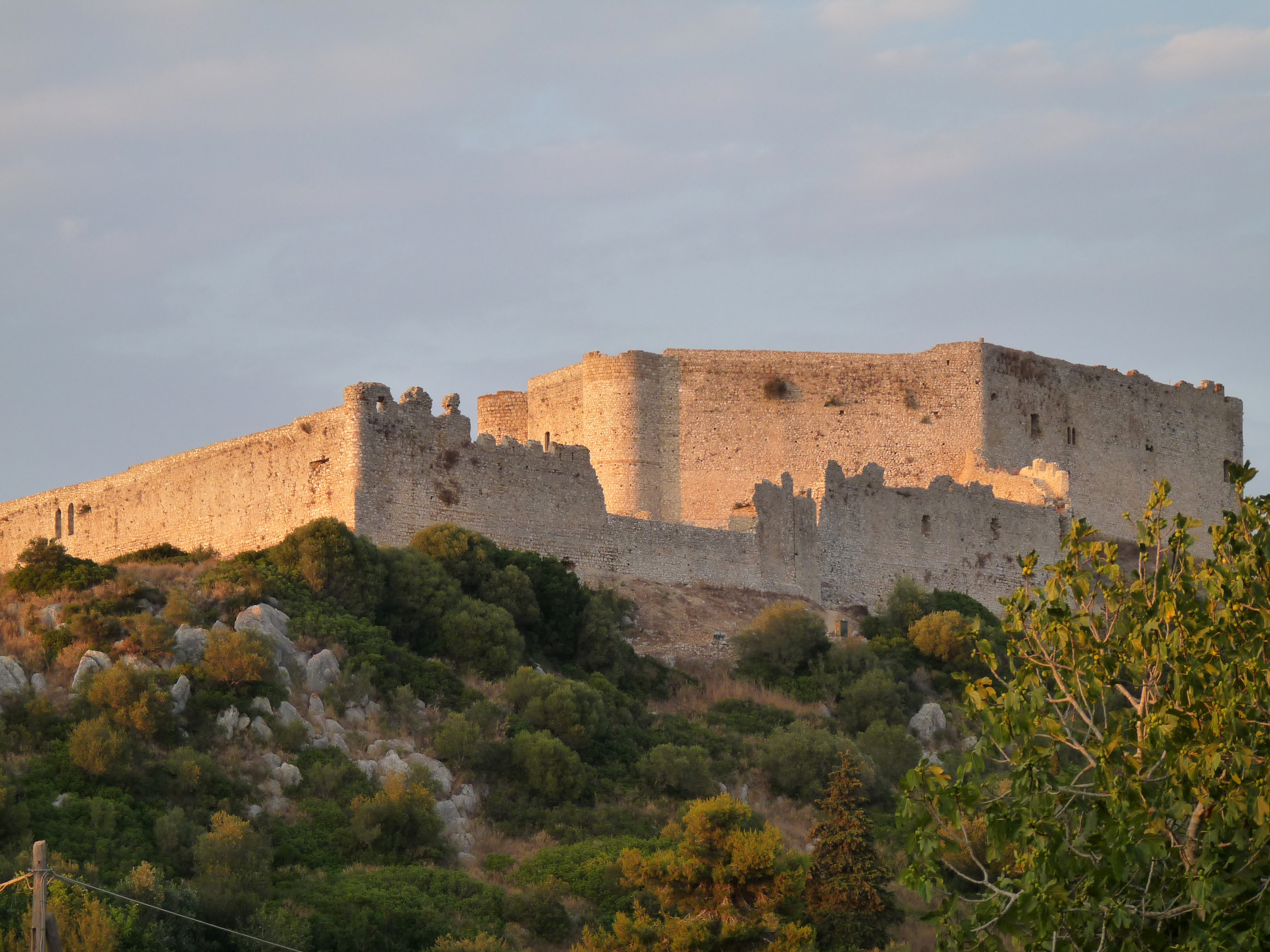

== See also ==
- Constantine XI

== Sources ==
- Andrews, Kevin A. (2006). Castles of the Morea. American School of Classical Studies at Athens. ISBN 978-0-87661-406-8.
- Bon, Antoine (1969). La Morée franque. Recherches historiques, topographiques et archéologiques sur la principauté d'Achaïe [The Frankish Morea. Historical, Topographic and Archaeological Studies on the Principality of Achaea] (in French). Paris: De Boccard.
- Nicolle, David (2007). Crusader Castles in Cyprus, Greece and the Aegean, 1191–1571. Fortress 59. Osprey Publications. ISBN 978-1-84176-976-9.
- Sotiriou, G. (1916–17). "Le château-fort de Chlemoutsi et son atelier monétaire de tournois de Clarentia". Journal International d'Archéologie Numismatique (in French). XIX: 273–279.
- Traquair, Ramsay (1907). "Mediaeval Fortresses in the North-Western Peloponnesus". The Annual of the British School at Athens, No. XIII, Session 1906–1907]. London. pp. 268–284.
