= Alexios Branas =

12th-century Byzantine military leader and usurper

- Born: Adrianople (now Edirne, Turkey)
- Died: 1187
- Cause of death: (KIA)
- Other name: Alexios Branas Komnenos
- Spouse: Anna Vatatzaina
- Children: Theodore Branas
- Relatives: Michael Branas (father), Maria Komnene (mother)
- Military career
- Allegiance: Byzantine Empire
- Service years: fl. 1166–1187
- Rank: sebastos (1166), protosebastos, panhypersebastos
- Commands: Field army
- Conflicts: Byzantine–Hungarian War (1180–1185); Norman invasion (1185); Battle of Demetritzes; Uprising of Asen and Peter (1185–1187)

Alexios Branas (Greek: Ἀλέξιος Βρανᾶς; fl. 1166–died 1187) was a Byzantine general, one of relatively few prominent generals never to raise a rebellion against Andronikos I Komnenos (r. 1183–1185), on whose behalf he led a campaign against Hungary and countered the rebellion of Theodore Kantakouzenos in Anatolia. A staunch Komnenos supporter, he led a rebellion against the new emperor Isaac II Angelos (r. 1185–1195) in 1187 and was killed in action.

== Background ==
Alexios Branas belonged to the prominent Branas family of Adrianople, and was doubly linked to the imperial Komnenos family. He was the son of sebastos Michael Branas and Maria Komnene, who was the grand-daughter of the first sebastokrator, Isaac Komnenos, the latter being the brother of Alexios I Komnenos (r. 1081–1118). He himself married Anna Vatatzaina, the niece of Manuel I Komnenos (r. 1143–1180). Anna's sister, Theodora Vatatzaina, was also Manuel's lover. The Vatatzes, into which Alexios Branas was married, were another family prominent in the city and region of Adrianople. Branas was described by a contemporary as "Small in stature, but colossal in the depth and the deviousness of his understanding and by far the best general of his time". He is first mentioned in 1166, holding the title of sebastos.

== Career ==
In 1182, Béla III of Hungary invaded the northern Byzantine territories of Belgrade and Braničevo and raided as far as Niš and Sofia. The experienced generals, Alexios Branas and Andronikos Lapardas, were successfully dispatched against the Serbs and Hungarians in 1183. As a reward for loyalty, Branas was raised to the exalted rank of protosebastos by Andronikos I Komnenos (r. 1183–1185). Following this, he quelled Theodore Kantakouzenos' rebellion in Anatolia. The fall of Thessalonica to the Norman invaders and their advance towards Constantinople precipitated the downfall of Andronikos I and the elevation of Isaac II Angelos. Isaac II armed and paid Anatolian volunteers and sent them to join the field army under Alexios Branas, which was blocking the Norman advance. At the Battle of Demetritzes he gained an overwhelming and decisive victory (November 1185), which effectively ended the Norman threat to the Empire. The chronicles of Niketas Choniates and Theodore Skoutariates both call him a strategos during events of 1185. The same year, Isaac gave him the title of panhypersebastos, a rank that put him only second to the emperor in terms of prestige.

In late autumn of 1187, Isaac II sent Branas to counter the Vlach-Bulgarian uprising of Asen and Peter. Leading a great army, and supported by his relatives in Adrianople, Branas contemplated rebellion Branas held the new emperor Isaac II Angelos in contempt, this, combined with his successes as a general and his connections to the former imperial dynasty of the Komnenoi, emboldened him to aspire to the throne. Proclaimed the emperor by his army in Adrianople, Branas set out to take Constantinople. Despite initial success, Branas was unable to advance past the walls of the city, as the citizens were against him, possibly because he represented the provincial aristocracy. Isaac's brother-in-law Conrad of Montferrat led imperial troops out of Constantinople, both cavalry and infantry. Branas' army could not endure the onset of Conrad's heavily armed infantry or impetuous cavalry and began to break in flight. In desperation, having failed to rally his troops, Branas personally attacked Conrad, but his lance thrust did little harm. Conrad then unhorsed Branas, his lance striking the cheekpiece of Branas' helmet. Once on the ground, Alexios Branas was beheaded by Conrad's supporting footsoldiers. With their leader dead, the rebel army fled the field. Branas' head was taken to the imperial palace, where it was treated like a football, and was then sent to his wife Anna, who (according to the historian Niketas Choniates) reacted bravely to the shocking sight. After this defeat, many in Branas' army joined the army of Asen and Peter and fought against Isaac.

Five of his seals have survived.

== Children ==
It was probably after his death that his son, Theodore Branas, became the lover of the dowager Empress Anna (Agnes of France): they were together by 1193 according to the Western chronicler Alberic of Trois-Fontaines. Theodore was appointed Caesar and created hereditary lord of Adrianople by the Latin Empire. Alexios Branas also had a daughter, probably named Eudokia, who married Isaac Angelos, son of the sebastokrator John Doukas.

== Sources ==
- Angold, Michael (1984). The Byzantine Empire, 1025–1204: A Political History (First ed.). London and New York: Longman. ISBN 0-582-49060-X.
- Choniates, Nicetas (1984). O City of Byzantium, Annals of Niketas Choniatēs. Translated by Harry J. Magoulias. Detroit: Wayne State University Press. ISBN 0-8143-1764-2.
- Lachowicz, Paweł (2021). "The Title Hierarchy of the Last Komnenoi and the Angelos Dynasty–from Sebastohypertatos to Sebastokrator". Studia Ceranea. 11. Waldemar Ceran Research Centre: 283–300.
- Ĭordanov, Ivan (2003). Corpus of Byzantine Seals from Bulgaria. Agato. ISBN 978-954-92395-5-3.
- Zhekova, Zhenya (2021). "Alexios Komnenos Branas–the last general of the Komnenoi (based to his seals)". Studia Academica Šumenensia. 8: 171–181.
