= Konstantinos Andravidiotis =

Chieftain of the Greek War of Independence

Konstantinos Papadimitropoulos
- Κωνσταντίνος Παπαδημητρόπουλος
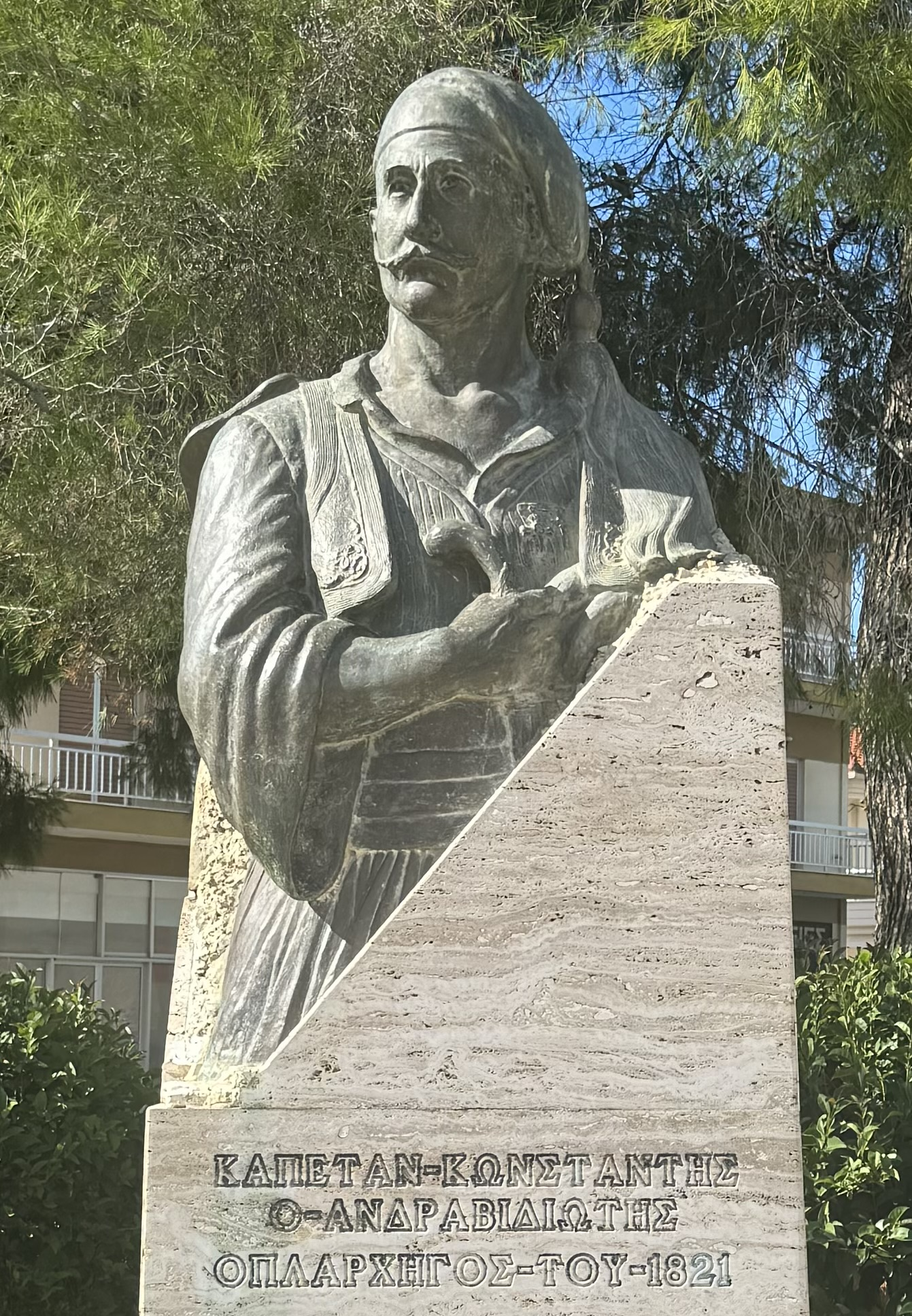
- A bust of Konstantis Andravidiotis in Andravida

Mayor of Myrtoudion
- Monarch: Otto of Greece

Personal details
- Born: 18th century Andravida, Morea Eyalet, Ottoman Empire (now Greece)
- Died: 1856
- Children: 7
- Nickname(s): Konstantis Andravidiotis; Κωνσταντής Ανδραβιδιώτης

Military service
- Allegiance: United Kingdom; Hellenic State; Kingdom of Greece
- Branch/service: British Army; Hellenic Army
- Rank: Major
- Unit: Royal Phalanx
- Battles/wars: Greek War of Independence; Battle of Lalas

Konstantinos Papadimitropoulos (Greek: Κωνσταντίνος Παπαδημητρόπουλος), better known as Konstantis Andravidiotis (Greek: Κωνσταντίνος Ανδραβιδιώτης) was a chieftain of the Greek War of Independence from Andravida.

== Biographical information ==
Andravidiotis was born in Andravida and had been active against the Ottoman rule since the pre-revolutionary period. Due to his action, he was forced to resort to Zakynthos, where he served in the British Army and became friends with Theodoros Kolokotronis and Charalambos Vilaetis.

After the declaration of the Greek Revolution in Gastouni, on 29 March 1821 Andravidiotis came under the command of Georgios Sisinis and was appointed head of the armed forces of Elis, while he forced the local Ottoman forces to take refuge in the castle of Chlemoutsi. Then, he participated with other chieftains and notables to the revolutionary congress of Pyrgos where the action against the Albanians of Lala was decided. During the revolution, he took part in several battles including the Battle of Lala, the battle in Pousi, in Andravida, in Gastouni, in Patras, in Santameri, and in Portes. In 1825 he became chiliarch.

With the creation of an independent Greek state, Andravidiotis remained in the army and in 1831 was employed with Diakos and Koumaniotis in the pursuit of an armed group that operated in Elis, while in 1835 he took over the pursuit against the Chondrogiannis robber clan. In July 1847 he became major in the Royal Phalanx ranked in the 4th class among majors. After his retirement, he became mayor of Myrtoudion. He died in 1856. From his marriage, he had four daughters and three sons.
