= Narjot de Toucy (died 1241) =

French noble

Narjot III de Toucy (died 1241), lord of Bazarnes, was the son of Narjot II of Toucy (France) and his wife Agnes de Dampierre.

== Life ==
Alongside his father-in-law Theodore Branas and Geoffroy de Merry, Narjot de Toucy formed part of the council that briefly governed Constantinople from 17 December 1219 (on the death of Conon de Béthune) until the arrival of the designated Emperor, Robert of Courtenay, in 1220. He served as regent of the Latin Empire in 1228–1231, during the minority of Baldwin II of Constantinople and in 1238–1239 during the Emperor's fund-raising journey in western Europe. He died in 1241.

== Marriage and issue ==
Narjot de Toucy's first wife was the daughter of Theodore Branas and the dowager Empress Anna (Agnes of France). They had four children:

- Philip of Toucy, who was regent of the Latin Empire from 1245 to 1247 and Admiral of Sicily in 1271.
- Anselin of Toucy, lord of Mottola.
- An unnamed daughter, who in 1239 married William II of Villehardouin, prince of Achaea.
- Margaret of Toucy, who married Leonardo of Veruli, Chancellor of the Principality of Achaea.

In 1239 or 1240, presumably after his first wife's death, Narjot de Toucy married the daughter of Jonas, King of the Cumans. She became a nun after his death.

== Bibliography ==
- Jean Longnon, "Les Toucy en Orient et en Italie au XIIIe siècle" in Bulletin de La Société des Sciences Historiques et Naturelles de l'Yonne (1953/1956)
- Geanakoplos, Deno John (1953). "Greco-Latin Relations on the Eve of the Byzantine Restoration: The Battle of Pelagonia-1259". Dumbarton Oaks Papers. 7. doi:10.2307/1291057. JSTOR 1291057.
