= Strousi =

Strousi Στρούσι
- Community
- Location within Greece
- Coordinates: 37°55′N 21°14′E
- Country: Greece
- Administrative region: West Greece
- Regional unit: Elis
- Municipality: Andravida-Kyllini
- Municipal unit: Andravida

Population (2021)
  - Community: 291
- Time zone: UTC+2 (EET)
  - Summer (DST): UTC+3 (EEST)
- Vehicle registration: ΗΑ

Strousi (Greek: Στρούσι) is a village in the western part of the municipal unit of Andravida in Elis, Greece. It is situated in a flat rural area, 1 km south of Myrsini, 3 km west of Andravida, 3 km east of Neochori and 3 km northeast of Dimitra.

Year	Population
1981	335
1991	321
2001	342
2011	324
2021	291

== See also ==
- List of settlements in Elis
