= Dimitritsi =

Dimitritsi Δημητρίτσι
- Community
- Location within Greece
- Coordinates: 40°59′04″N 23°24′52″E
- Country: Greece
- Administrative region: Central Macedonia
- Regional unit: Serres
- Municipality: Visaltia
- Municipal unit: Visaltia
- Elevation: 25 m (82 ft)

Population (2021)
  - Community: 633
- Time zone: UTC+2 (EET)
  - Summer (DST): UTC+3 (EEST)
- Postal code: 62200
- Area code: 23220

Dimitritsi (Greek: Δημητρίτσι) is a village in the region of Serres, northern Greece. According to the 2021 Greek census, the village had 633 inhabitants.

== Geography and history ==
Dimitritsi is located to the west limits of the Kilkis Regional Unit, in the plain of Serres, nearby to the confluence of the Strymonas River with one of its tributaries, Kopatsianos. It is located 19 km southwest of Serres and 12 km northwest of Nigrita. Its inhabitants are engaged in livestock and agriculture, notably in cultivation of corns, Gossypium, olives, almonds, tobacco and vineyards.

According to Byzantine historian Niketas Choniates in 1185 a battle took place at the place called "Dimitrizis". The historic Battle of Demetritzes between the Byzantine troops and the Normans of the Kingdom of Sicily took place on 7 November 1185 and ended with a victory of the Byzantines following a surprise attack as the Normans attempted to enter into deliberate negotiations.

According to the statistics of the Bulgarian geographer Vasil Kanchov, the village had a total population of 700 residents in 1900, consisting of 350 Orthodox Greeks, 200 Orthodox Bulgarians and 150 Turks. Following the Greco-Turkish War of 1919–1922, the Turkish inhabitants of the village were forced to leave, and in return, Greeks from Asia Minor from the regions of Smyrna and Bursa settled in the village as the Population exchange demanded. They established their own settlement on the east side of the village, where there were no locals.

Historical population
Year	Pop.	±%
2001	1,206	—
2011	989	−18.0%
2021	633	−36.0%

== Administration ==
The village was officially mentioned in 1920 to be attached to the community of Dimitritsi at that time. According to the Kallikratis Plan, the local community of Dimitritsi belongs to the municipality of Visaltia.
