= Vrána =

Vrána (feminine: Vránová) is a Czech surname meaning 'crow'. Notable people with the surname include:

- Alena Vránová (born 1932), Czech actress
- Gabriela Vránová (1939–2018), Czech actress and voice actress
- Jakub Vrána (born 1996), Czech ice hockey player
- Josef Vrana (1905–1987), Czech Roman Catholic bishop
- Pavel Vrána (born 1985), Czech footballer
- Petr Vrána (born 1985, Czech ice hockey player
- Vlasta Vrána (born 1950), Canadian-Czech actor

== See also ==
- Vrana (disambiguation)
