= Agnes of France (empress) =

Byzantine empress from 1180 to 1185

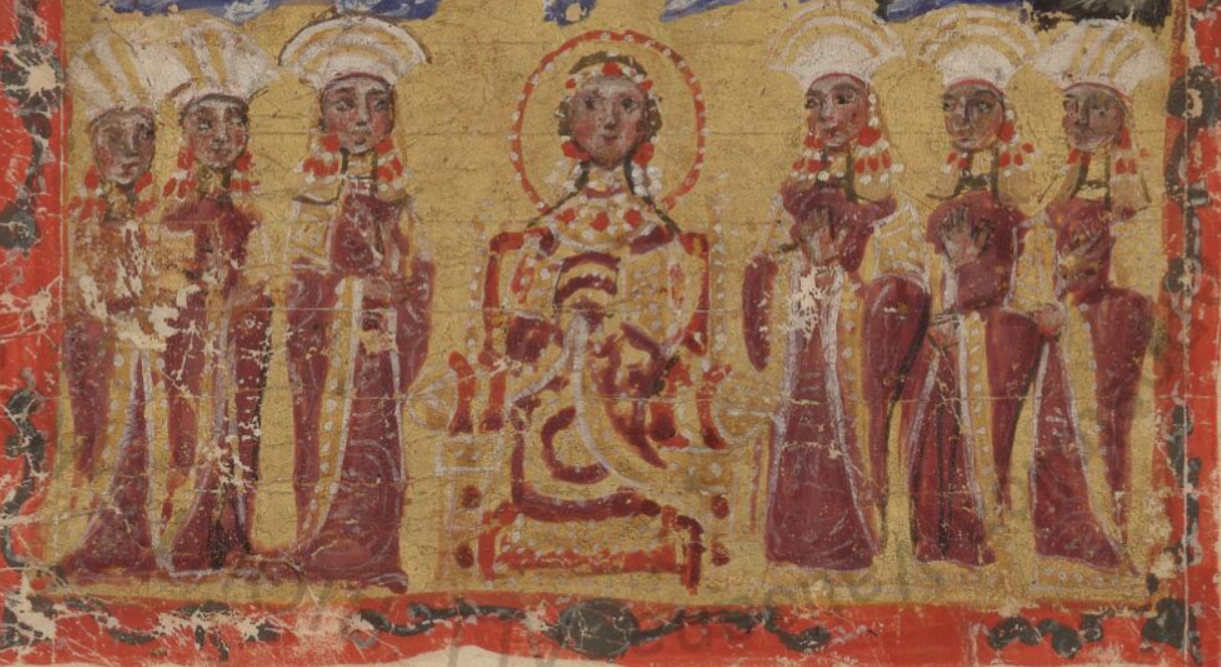
- Ladies paying court to Agnes of France, aged 8, on her wedding to Alexios II. From an illuminated manuscript, ca. 1179. (Note: The identification of this figure from Vat. Gr. 1851 as Agnes of France is by Ioannis Spatharakis. Other historians variously identify her as Maria of Bulgaria or Anna of Hungary.)

Empress consort of the Byzantine Empire
- Tenure: 2 March 1180 – 12 September 1185
- Born: before February 1171
- Died: 1220, or after 1240
- Spouse: Alexios II Komnenos (m. 1180; died 1183) Andronikos I Komnenos (m. 1183; died 1185) Theodore Branas (m. 1204)
- Issue: Unnamed daughter (m. Narjot de Toucy) Unnamed daughter (m.Baldwin of Bethune, caesar and Lord of Adrianople) Unnamed son (m.a Laskaris daughter, father of Irene Komnene Laskarina Branaina)
- House: Capet
- Father: Louis VII of France
- Mother: Adèle of Champagne

Agnes of France, renamed Anna (1171 – 1220/after 1240), was Byzantine empress by marriage to Alexios II Komnenos and Andronikos I Komnenos. She was a daughter of Louis VII of France and Adèle of Champagne.

== Early life ==
Agnes was born in Orleans on an unknown date in 1170, or in January 1171 at the latest King Louis VII and his significantly younger bride, Adela of Champagne second child. Her birth inspired little fanfare and went unrecorded as it was in the wake of France's long-awaited heir, her brother, Philippe Auguste, not to mention she had a plethora of elder half-sisters, totaling four, from her father's previous ill-fated marriages.

Reportedly, the union of her parents inspired scandal, as it occurred a mere two weeks following the death in childbirth of her father's second wife, Constance of Castile, in a desperate bid by Louis to secure the kingdom's succession, as he still had no legitimate son by then. Agnes' mother, Adela, was notably lower in station than Louis' previous consorts: the first, Eleanor, was heiress to the vast Duchy of Aquitaine and renowned for her domineering nature, and the second, a daughter to Alfonso VII of León and Castile, a man dubbed 'Emperor of All Spain' by his contemporaries, while Adela's father was merely the Count of Champagne. Thus, it has been inferred Louis selected her mother due to proximity and a means by which to circumvent lengthy marriage talks, seeing as Adela was his subject and already a fixture at the court of Paris.

The first request of a Byzantine betrothal seemingly arrived as early as 1171, as Manuel I ordered Philip of Flanders to settle for the “last” daughter still available on the “marriage market” for his own son, Alexios. Manuel I was seemingly worried as he wrote to the Archbishop of Reims, asking him to dissuade to the king of France from marrying his daughter to Frederick Barbarossa son. The union was supported by Pope Alexander III, but the initial negotiations did not go ahead at the time.

== Betrothal and marriage ==
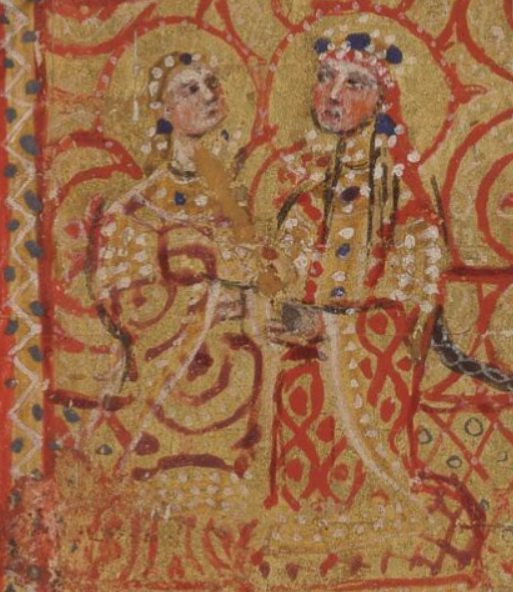
Agnes of France (left) meeting Maria Komnene (right).

In early 1178, Philip, Count of Flanders visited Constantinople on his way back from the Holy Land. The Byzantine Emperor Manuel I Komnenos, who had already entertained Louis VII in Constantinople at Christmas 1147 during the Second Crusade, was perhaps finally convinced by Philip that France would be a desirable ally in Western Europe. Over the winter of 1178-1179 an Imperial embassy accompanying Philip, and led by the Genoese Baldovino Guercio, was sent to the French court to secure a match between Agnes and Alexios, the only son and heir apparent of Manuel by his second wife Maria of Antioch.

It was not uncommon for princesses, when a future marriage had been agreed, to be brought up in their intended husband's family; this, indeed, is why Agnes probably never met her elder sister Alys, who lived in the Kingdom of England from the age of about nine, when her marriage to the future Richard I of England was agreed on (though this marriage never took place). Agnes took ship in Montpellier, bound for Constantinople, at Easter 1179. At Genoa the flotilla increased from 5 to 19 ships, captained by Baldovino Guercio.

On arrival in Constantinople in late summer 1179 Agnes was met by seventy high-ranking ladies and lavish festivities were organized for her. She was greeted with an oration from Eustathios, former Master of the Rhetors and archbishop of Thessalonica. She was perhaps now presented with an elaborate volume of welcoming verses by an anonymous author, sometimes called the Eisiterion. She was taken outside the city to be welcomed by Maria Porphyrogenita, Manuel's only surviving daughter from a first wedding, inside a tent, and to change into Byzantine clothes. Then she entered the City officially.

According to William of Tyre, Agnes was eight on her arrival at Constantinople, while Alexios was thirteen. William got Alexios' age wrong (he was 10). In any case, she was at least two years too young for marriage, according to most 12th-century views. However, William of Tyre, who was present at the ceremony, seems to describe it as a full wedding (matrimonii legibus ... copulare); in this he is followed by some other non-Byzantine sources and by many modern authors.

The ceremony took place in the Trullo Hall, in the Great Palace, on 2 March 1180. Agnes was officially renamed Anna. Eustathios of Thessalonica produced a speech to celebrate the occasion, whose title in the manuscript is Oration on the Public Celebrations of the Betrothal of the Two Royal Children. This ceremony came approximately one month after the wedding of Alexios' half-sister Maria Porphyrogenita to Renier of Montferrat, conducted by the Patriarch of Constantinople, Theodosios.

== Empress ==
On 24 September 1180, Manuel died and Alexios succeeded him as Emperor. He was too young to rule unaided; his mother, Maria of Antioch, exercised more influence in affairs of state than Alexios or Anna.

In 1183 Maria of Antioch was displaced by a new power behind the throne, Andronikos I Komnenos. Andronikos was a first cousin of Manuel and was known to have harbored imperial ambitions for himself. He is believed to have arranged the deaths by poisoning of Maria Porphyrogenita and her husband Renier; he certainly imprisoned, and soon afterwards executed, Maria of Antioch. Andronikos was crowned co-ruler with Alexios; then, in October of the same year, he had Alexios strangled. Anna was now 12, and the approximately 65-year-old Andronikos married her.

Andronikos had previously been married (his first wife's name is unknown). He had had sexual relationships with two nieces (Eudokia Komnene and Theodora Komnene) and with Philippa of Antioch. Philippa was a daughter of Constance of Antioch and her first husband and consort Raymond of Poitiers; she was also a sister of Maria of Antioch and thus maternal aunt of Alexios. Andronikos had two sons by his first wife; he also had a young son and daughter from his affair with Theodora. His eldest son Manuel already had a son of his own, the future Alexios I of Trebizond.

Anna was Empress consort for two years, until the deposition of Andronikos in September 1185. In an attempt to escape the popular uprising that ended his rule, Andronikos fled from Constantinople with Anna and his mistress (known only as Maraptike). They reached Chele, a fortress on the Bithynian coast of the Black Sea, where they tried to take ship for the Crimea. Their ship was prevented from sailing by contrary winds. Andronikos was eventually captured and returned to the capital, where he was tortured and killed on 12 September 1185.

== Later life ==
Anna survived Andronikos' fall and is next heard of in 1193, when she is said by a Western chronicler to have become the lover of Theodore Branas, a military leader who fought on the Empire's northern frontier. They did not at first marry, possibly because Anna already had two husbands, and a third match would have required the difficult Church approval, a third marriage being difficult to obtain in the Greek Orthodox Church. Moreover, as dowager empress of Andronikos, she was closely watched by Isaac's new regime.

While her life during this period is blurry, Anna certainly cautioned Isaac II (who had usurped Andronikos) downfall, whose main conspiracy in 1195, was led by (among others) her lover Branas. During Alexios III’s reign, she was back in the emperor's inner circle with Theodore.

When the Crusaders requested to see her in 1203, she reproached them for putting Alexios IV on the throne and was rude to them, pretending not to speak French anymore. Nonetheless, she accepted a private meeting with her cousin, Louis of Blois.

After the fall of Constantinople in 1204, Agnes derived respect from the Latin barons due to her being a former empress. According to Robert of Clari, Agnes had a bad reputation and could only talk through a translator because she did not know French. At that time she was 30 years old and had spent most of her life in the Byzantine court. She may have compelled the aforementioned Theodore to swear fealty to the Latins, following the fall of Constantinople.

Anna and Theodore eventually married, at the urging of the Latin emperor Baldwin I of Constantinople, in summer 1204. During the rule of the Latins, she obtained for Theodore the governance of Adrianople, Apros and Demotica, who were fully shared with herself. Theodore Branas continued to fight for the Latin Empire, and is last heard of in 1219, by which time Agnes has already disappeared from the historical record. They had at least one daughter, whose name is apparently lost to history, married Narjot de Toucy, a prominent nobleman who served as regent of the Latin Empire twice. A possible second daughter wed Baldwin of Bethune, who died between 1227 and 1228. Decades later, a prominent socialite of Byzantium by the name of Irene Komnene Laskarina Branaina claimed descent from Agnes, through an unregistered son who wed a Laskaris daughter, possibly one of Michael Laskaris own.

Her date of death is sometimes given in modern genealogies as "1220" or "after 1240".

== Cultural references ==
The crusader Robert of Clari, writing only 25 years after the event, is clear about the rich entourage that accompanied Agnes to Constantinople:

then the king arrayed his sister very richly and sent her with the messengers to Constantinople, and many of his people with her ... When they were come, the emperor did very great honor to the damsel and made great rejoicing over her and her people ...

In that account the embassy is attributed to Agnes' brother, Philip II of France, but in fact it was sent by her father, Louis VII.

Agnes is the subject of the historical novel Agnes of France (1980) by Greek writer Kostas Kyriazis (b. 1920). The novel describes the events of the reigns of Manuel, Alexios and Andronikos through her eyes. She is also part of the cast of the sequels Fourth Crusade (1981) and Henry of Hainaut (1984). All three have been in print in Greece since their first edition.

== Sources ==
- Nicetas Choniates, Historia, ed. J.-L. Van Dieten, 2 vols. (Berlin and New York, 1975); trans. as O City of Byzantium, Annals of Niketas Choniates, by H.J. Magoulias (Detroit; Wayne State University Press, 1984). Eustathios of Thessaloniki, a Disembarkation Speech for Agnes-Anna (ed. P. Wirth, Eustathii Thessalonicensis Opera Minora pp. 250–60 and translated with commentary by Andrew F. Stone, Eustathios of Thessaloniki, Secular Orations, pp. 147–65, Eustathios, The Capture of Thessaloniki ed. John R. Melville-Jones, pp. 53 and 188 and Lynda Garland Byzantine empresses: women and power in Byzantium, AD 527-1204. London, Routledge, 1999.
- Kinoshita, Sharon (2006). Medieval Boundaries: Rethinking Difference in Old French Literature. University of Pennsylvania Press.

== Bibliography ==
- Henry Gardiner Adams, ed. (1857). "Agnes of France" . A Cyclopaedia of Female Biography: 13–14. Wikidata Q115375928 – via Wikisource.
- Cartellieri, Alexander. Philipp II. August, König von Frankreich. Vols 1–2. Leipzig: Dyksche Buchhandlung, 1899–1906.
- Hilsdale, Cecily J. "Constructing a Byzantine Augusta: A Greek Book for a French Bride" in Art Bulletin vol. 87 (2005) pp. 458–483 Paywall
- Magdalino, Paul. The Empire of Manuel I Komnenos. 2002.

Agnes of France (empress) Capetian dynasty Born: 1171 Died: after 1204
Royal titles
| Preceded by Maria of Antioch | Byzantine Empress consort 1180/1183–1185 | Succeeded by Margaret of Hungary |
