= Theodore Branas =

Byzantine general

- Spouse: Agnes of France
- Military career
- Allegiance: Byzantine Empire; Latin Empire
- Rank: Byzantine Empire: doux of the theme of Adrianople-Didymoteichon; Latin Empire: Caesar, Lord of Adrianople, Didymoteichon and Apros
- Conflicts: Prousenos (1189), Siege of Constantinople (1203), Siege of Didymoteichon (1206)

Theodore Branas or Vranas (Greek: Θεόδωρος Βρανᾶς, Theodōros Branas), sometimes called Theodore Komnenos Branas, was a general under the Byzantine Empire and afterwards under the Latin Empire of Constantinople. Under the Latin regime he was given the title Caesar and in 1206 he became governor and lord of Adrianople. He is called Livernas by western chroniclers of the Fourth Crusade, including Geoffroi de Villehardouin.

== Origins and early career ==
Theodore was the son of general and protosebastos Alexios Branas and of Anna Komnene Vatatzina, the second daughter of Theodore Vatatzes. He was probably born in Adrianople, where his family held hereditary lands. He was a descendant of the imperial dynasty of the Komnenoi through both his parents, and was a great-nephew of Manuel I Komnenos. His father, who defeated the Siculo-Norman invasion of Byzantium at the Battle of Demetritzes, was killed in 1187 when leading a rebellion against Isaac II Angelos. In 1193, according to the chronicler Alberic of Trois-Fontaines, Theodore became the lover of the dowager empress Anna, then aged 22. She was the daughter of King Louis VII of France by his third wife Adèle of Champagne, and the sister of Philip II of France. She had originally come to Constantinople to be married to Alexios II Komnenos, but Alexios was murdered by his co-emperor and regent Andronikos I Komnenos in 1183. She was then married to Andronikos, and was again widowed on his violent death in 1185. Though of French birth, Anna became thoroughly Byzantine in culture and Greek in language; she insisted on employing an interpreter when talking to a party of crusaders, claiming to have completely forgotten the French language.

Theodore fought with limited success under Isaac II Angelos. As the commander of the Alan mercenaries, he was the only Byzantine leader to resist the German crusaders in a clash at Prousenos near Philippopolis in 1189. Together with John Petraliphas, Michael Kantakouzenos and others, he was involved in the successful plot to replace Isaac with his brother Alexios III Angelos in 1195. He fought against various enemies under Alexios III, including the Turks (where he was the only general to escape capture among the three following Alexios III, in 1197) and was appointed doux (provincial governor) of the theme of Adrianople and Didymoteichon. He was prominent in the initial defence of Constantinople against the Fourth Crusade, in 1202–1203.

== Life in the Latin Empire ==
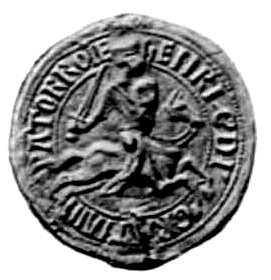
Seal of Henry of Flanders, Emperor of the Latin Empire, 1205-1216

After the fall of Constantinople in 1204 Theodore seems to have speedily come to an accommodation with the new Latin regime. Theodore and Anna married, the date of their marriage is unknown. They had at least one daughter, who married Narjot de Toucy. For several years after 1204 Theodore, and presumably Anna, were of invaluable assistance to the Empire. Theodore was one of the few notable Greeks to offer it his immediate support, and, possibly in 1206, received the title of Caesar in return.

Branas was a leader, under Alexios Aspietes, of the Greek party in Philippopolis in opposition to the rule of the Bulgarian Tsar Kaloyan. He managed to escape the violent sacking of the city by the Bulgarians, after which Aspietes was executed. Being an avowed anti-Bulgarian Greek and a native of Thrace, he developed even closer ties with the Latins, who were the only force actively confronting the Bulgarian Tsar. Kaloyan's destructive ruthlessness was a major cause of Greek desertions to the Latins. Choniates states that Branas was elected the leader of Greek troops who had made peace with the Latin regime in Constantinople. In 1206 Theodore Branas acted as a mediator between Henry of Flanders and the Greeks of Adrianople and Didymoteichon, who were menaced by the Bulgarians and wished to seek Latin protection for their cities. Branas was given command of the garrison of Adrianople, consisting of local Greek troops and 40 Latin knights, and later unsuccessfully defended Didymoteichon when it was besieged and sacked by Kaloyan (20 August 1206). In spring of 1207 Kaloyan went on the offensive again, and laid siege to Adrianople itself. The siege was abandoned even before a relief force from Constantinople arrived. A joint Latin and Adrianopolitan army, under Emperor Henry, then raided Bulgarian territory.

Theodore was Lord of Adrianople, Didymoteichon and Apros (known to the Latins as Naples or Napoli). The Pactum Adrianopolitanum dating to 1206, records the recognition by Marino Zeno, Venetian Podestà of Constantinople, of the right of "the hereditary ruler and captain, most worthy Caesar, most noble Komnenos, lord Theodore Branas", to govern Adrianople and its territories according to the customs of the Greeks, fully shared with his wife Anna. The lordship was feudal in nature, Branas as his service was to provide Venice with 500 cavalry when required. Venice, in turn was obliged to support Branas and the Adrianopolitans against all enemies. However, Branas held the town of Apros directly from the Latin emperor, and the dependency of the other territories on Venice was entirely theoretical. The last record of Theodore Branas is in 1219, when, like his son-in-law Narjot de Toucy, he briefly governed Constantinople as regent. His death has been estimated to have occurred around 1230

== Legacy ==
Theodore Branas was succeeded as Lord of Adrianople by Baldwin of Béthune (called rex Adronopili in the West), probably a son of Baldwin of Béthune, titular Count of Aumale. As the lordship was hereditary it is assumed that Baldwin married an otherwise unattested daughter of Branas. Baldwin was a relative of Cono of Béthune who held the Byzantine titles of protovestiarios and sebastokrator.

The Branas family in the later 13th century held extensive estates around Smyrna in Anatolia, they seem to have returned fully into Byzantine society and Theodore's granddaughter Irene married into the imperial family of the Palaiologoi.

== Sources ==
- Choniates, Nicetas (1984). O City of Byzantium, Annals of Niketas Choniatēs. Translated by Harry J. Magoulias. Detroit: Wayne State University Press. ISBN 0-8143-1764-2.
- Fine, John V. A. (1994) [1987]. The Late Medieval Balkans: A Critical Survey from the Late Twelfth Century to the Ottoman Conquest. Ann Arbor, Michigan: University of Michigan Press. ISBN 978-0-472-10079-8.
- Kazhdan, Alexander, ed. (1991). The Oxford Dictionary of Byzantium. Oxford and New York: Oxford University Press. ISBN 0-19-504652-8.
- Saint-Guillain, G. (1216) Identities and Allegiances in the Eastern Mediterranean after 1204, Routledge
- Van Tricht, Filip (2011). The Latin Renovatio of Byzantium: The Empire of Constantinople (1204–1228). Leiden: Brill. ISBN 978-90-04-20323-5.
- Van Tricht, Filip (2014). "The Byzantino-Latin Principality of Adrianople and the Challenge of Feudalism (1204/6–ca.1227/28): Empire, Venice, and Local Autonomy" (PDF). Dumbarton Oaks Papers. 68: 325–342.
