= Vrana =

Vrana may refer to:

- Vrána, Czech surname
- Vrana (military commander) (d. 1458), Albanian military leader
- Vrana, Zadar County, a village in Zadar County, Dalmatia, Croatia
- Vrana Palace, a former royal palace, located on the outskirts of Sofia, the capital of Bulgaria
- Lake Vrana (Cres), a lake on the island of Cres, Croatia
- Vrana, Cres, a village on the island of Cres
- Lake Vrana (Dalmatia), a lake near the eponymous village in Dalmatia, Croatia
- Vranje, a town in Serbia, also formerly known as Vrana
