= Andravida =

Andravida Ανδραβίδα
- Municipal unit
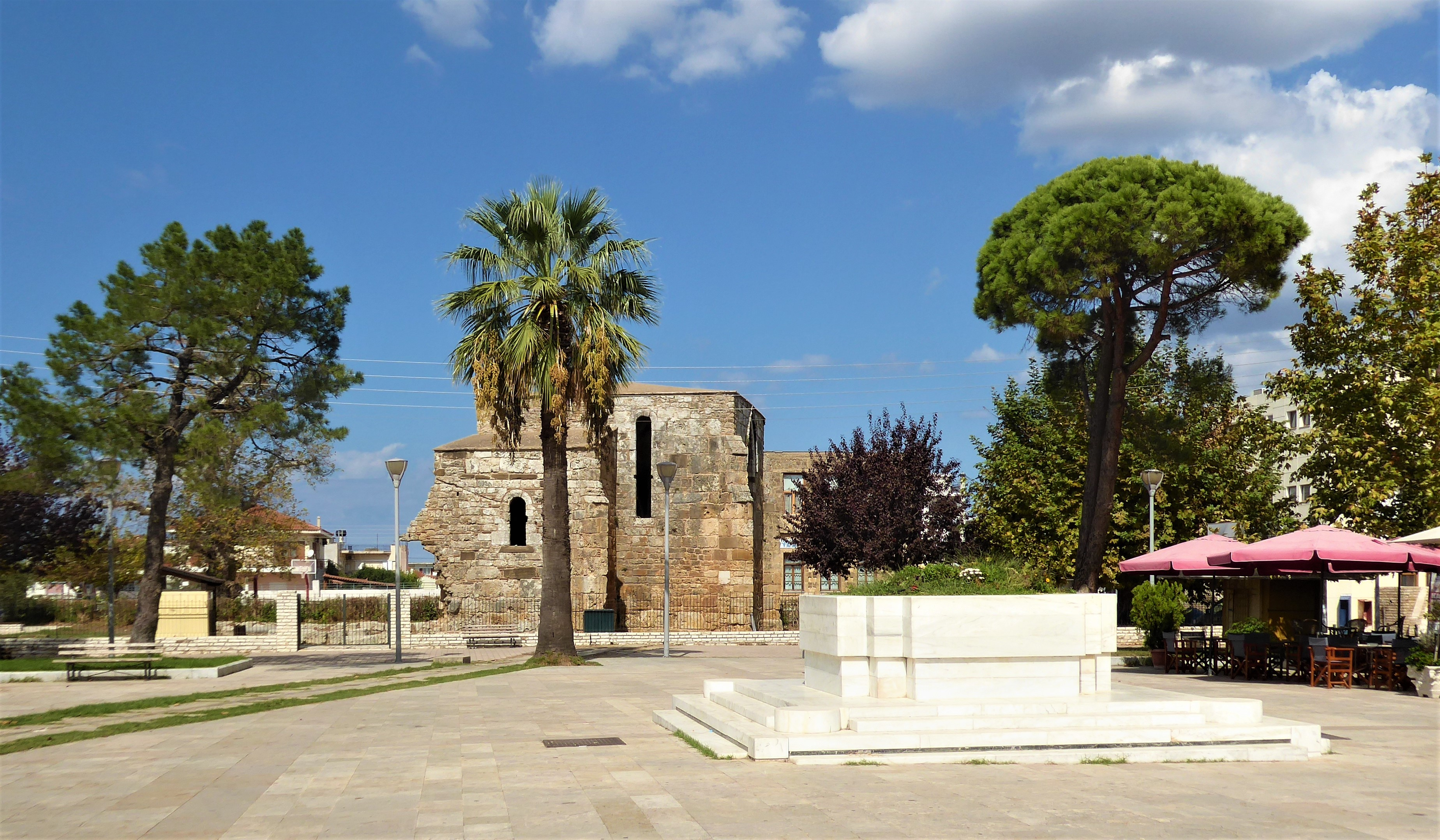
- Central Square with the ruin of the Church of Hagia Sophia

- Location within the regional unit

- Location within Greece
- Coordinates: 37°54′N 21°16′E
- Country: Greece
- Administrative region: West Greece
- Regional unit: Elis
- Municipality: Andravida-Kyllini

Area
  - Municipal unit: 40.73 km^{2} (15.73 sq mi)
- Elevation: 6 m (20 ft)

Population (2021)
  - Municipal unit: 3,753
  - Municipal unit density: 92.14/km^{2} (238.7/sq mi)
  - Community: 3,172
- Time zone: UTC+2 (EET)
  - Summer (DST): UTC+3 (EEST)
- Postal code: 270 51
- Area code: 26230
- Vehicle registration: ΗΑ
- Website: www.andravida-killini.gr

Andravida (Greek: Ανδραβίδα, [anðraˈviða]) is a town and a former municipality in Elis, in the northwest of the Peloponnese peninsula of Greece. Since the 2011 local government reform it is part of the municipality Andravida-Kyllini, of which it is a municipal unit. The municipal unit has an area of 40.728 km^{2}. Its population is about 3,700. The town was the capital of the Frankish Principality of Achaea in the late Middle Ages.

== Location ==
Andravida is located in the plains of northwestern Elis, at about 7 km from the Ionian Sea coast. It is 3 km south of Lechaina, 6 km north of Gastouni, 30 km northwest of Pyrgos and 55 km southwest of Patras.

The Greek National Road 9 (also E55) Patras-Pyrgos-Pylos passes east of the town. The Andravida Air Base is 2.5 km to the east of the city center.

== Population ==
| Year | Town population | Municipal unit population |
|---|---|---|
| 1981 | 3,460 | - |
| 1991 | 3,167 | 3,915 |
| 2001 | 3,579 | 4,309 |
| 2011 | 3,981 | 4,716 |
| 2021 | 3,172 | 3,753 |

== History ==
Coat of arms of the Principality of Achaea.

Andravida's early history is obscure: the name is of unknown provenance—several proposals have been made, the most probable of which is that it derives from a Slavic name for "place of the otters"—and the site is not mentioned before the conquest by the Crusaders in 1205, even though it certainly existed before that. According to the Chronicle of the Morea, Andravida, like most of the towns and regions of the northern and western Peloponnese, was captured without a fight in 1205 by the Crusader leader William of Champlitte, and it was there that the local Greek magnates and lords of Elis and of the mountains of Skorta and Mesarea paid him homage and recognized him as their lord.

Soon after the Frankish conquest, Andravida (known as Andreville in French, Andrevilla in Aragonese and Andravilla in Italian) became the residence of the princes of the newly established Principality of Achaea. As the medievalist Antoine Bon points out, Andravida's choice as the de facto capital of the principality rested on its favourable location: situated in the midst of the fertile plain of Elis, it was well provisioned and could sustain horses, it was located near the major port town of Glarentza, but not on the coast and hence not vulnerable to seaborne raids, and was equally far from the mountains of the central Peloponnese with their rebellious inhabitants. Consequently, despite its importance, it was never fortified. The town also became the seat of a Roman Catholic bishopric, attested since 1212, which assimilated the pre-existing Greek bishopric of Olena and retained the latter's name.

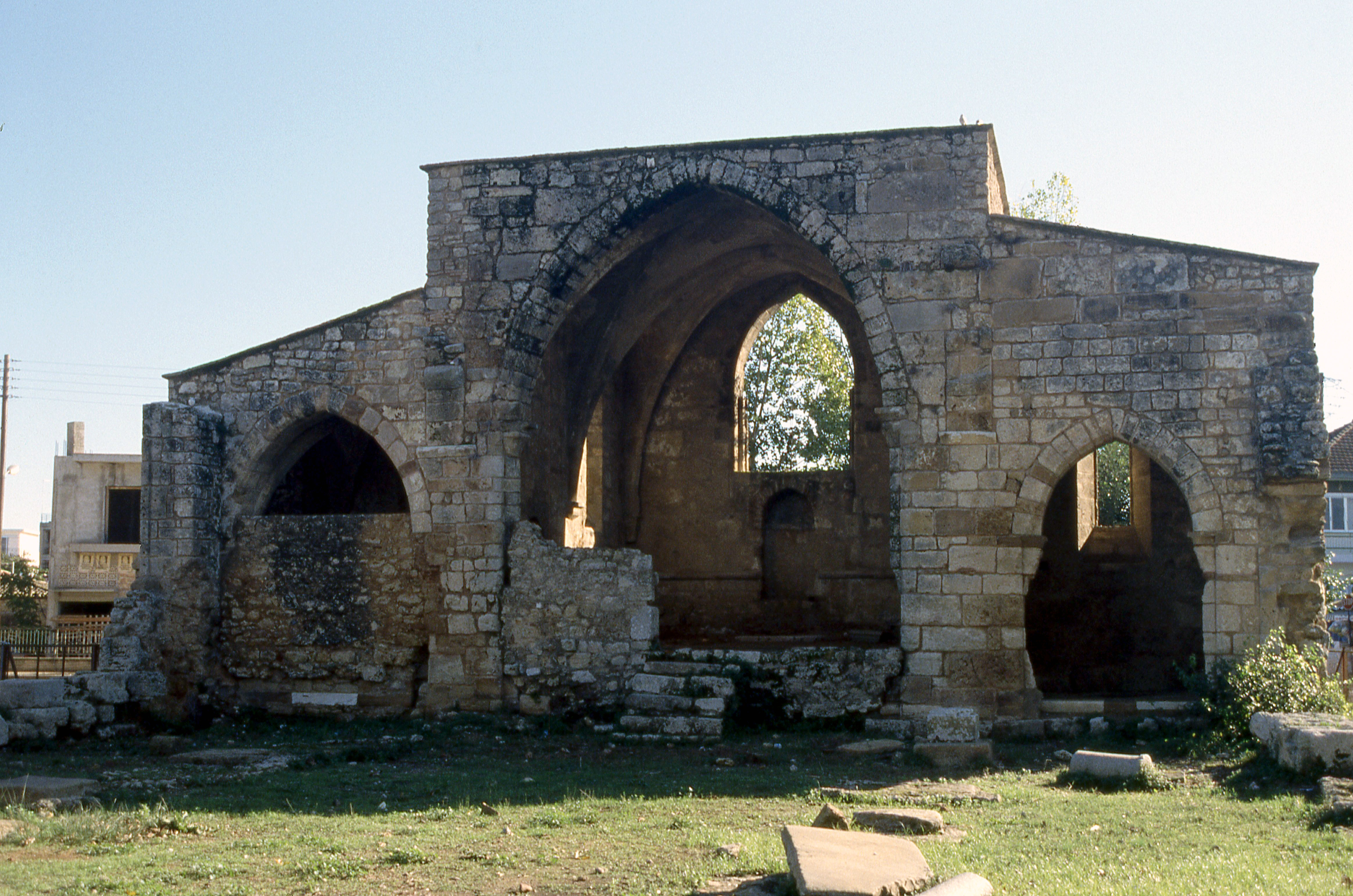
Church of Saint Sophia, Andravida

Only a few traces survive of the Frankish town, and most of the testimony about its buildings comes from literary sources: a palace for the Princes; the Church of Saint Stephen, possibly belonging to the Franciscans; the Church and hospice of Saint James, given to the Teutonic Order in 1241 and serving as the burial place for the princely House of Villehardouin; the convent of Saint Nicholas of Carmel; and the Church of Saint Sophia, serviced by the Dominicans and the largest of them all, by virtue of which it often served as the site of assemblies and parliaments of the principality's nobility. Early 19th-century travellers like François Pouqueville and Jean Alexandre Buchon reported that the three churches were still largely extant, but today only Saint Sophia survives to a substantial extent.

Like the rest of the Principality's remnants in Elis and Achaea, Andravida was conquered by the Despotate of the Morea in the late 1420s. In 1460 it was conquered by the Ottoman Empire and remained under Ottoman rule, with the exception of a brief Venetian period in 1686–1715, until Greek independence.

== People ==
- Konstantinos Andravidiotis, chieftain of the Greek War of Independence.

== Subdivisions ==
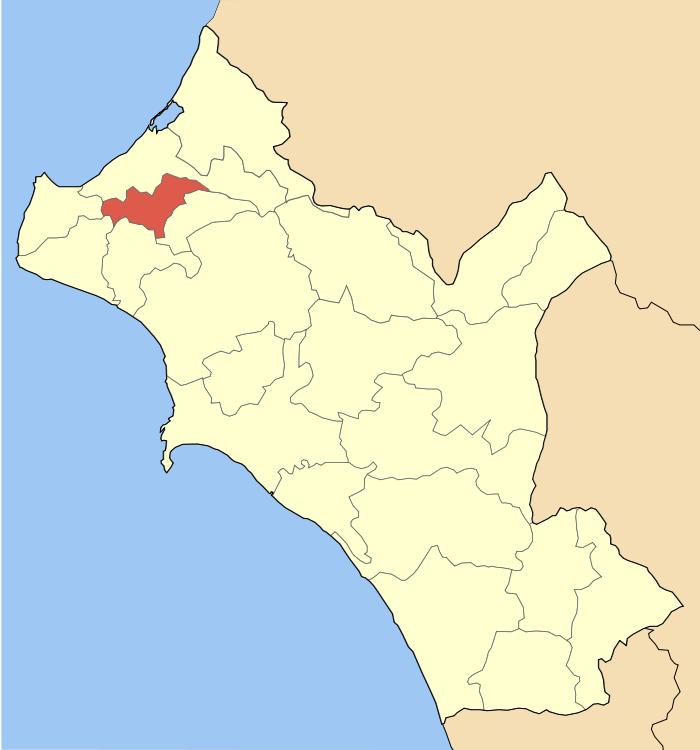
Municipality of Andravida within the regional unit of Elis.

The municipal unit Andravida is subdivided into the following communities (constituent villages in brackets):

- Andravida (Andravida, Agios Georgios), pop. 3,172 in 2021
- Stafidokampos, pop. 290
- Strousi, pop. 291

The small village Agios Georgios (pop. 62) lies 6 km east of Andravida town centre, on the east side of the air base.

== Sources ==
- Bon, Antoine (1969). La Morée franque. Recherches historiques, topographiques et archéologiques sur la principauté d'Achaïe (in French). Paris: De Boccard.
