= Leonard of Veroli =

Chancellor in crusader Achaea

Leonard of Veroli (Italian: Leonardo da Veroli, died 1281) was the chancellor to and close adviser of William II Villehardouin, Prince of Achaea. He was one of only two high officials of Achaea (the other being Peter of Vaux) not captured or killed at the Battle of Pelagonia.

Leonard was one of the few Italians who reached high posts on the Achaean Principality. It is unknown when exactly he came to the Morea, but in ca. 1252 he married Margaret, the daughter of Narjot de Toucy, then regent of the Latin Empire. He participated in the so-called "Ladies Parliament" of Nikli in 1261, and enjoyed the complete confidence of William II.

In 1267, he ratified the Treaty of Viterbo on behalf of William, sealing a marital pact between Philip, the son of Charles I of Sicily and William's daughter Isabella of Villehardouin as well as providing for the transfer of the Principality to the Angevins.

Leonard died childless ca. 1281.
