= Vranas (surname) =

Vranas is a Greek-language surname. It may refer to:

- Lamprinos Vranas, (d. 1905), Makedonomachoi.
- Andreas Vranas (1870–1935), painter
- Russos Vranas, author and journalist.
- Giorgos Vranas, Cretan folk musician.
- Sperantza Vrana (1926 or 1932–2009), actress

== See also ==
- Dimitrios Vranopoulos (1900–1980), member of the Greek Parliament and Minister
- Leandros Vranousis (1921–1993) philologist and historian specializing in the history of Epirus, author of many history books and articles, member of the Academy of Athens
- Epameinondas Vranopoulos, 20th-century historian, archaeologist and teacher of history, author of history books.
