= Battle of Demetritzes =

Battle in 1185 in the Balkans

Coordinates: 41°14′N 23°23′E

- Part of the Third Norman invasion of the Balkans
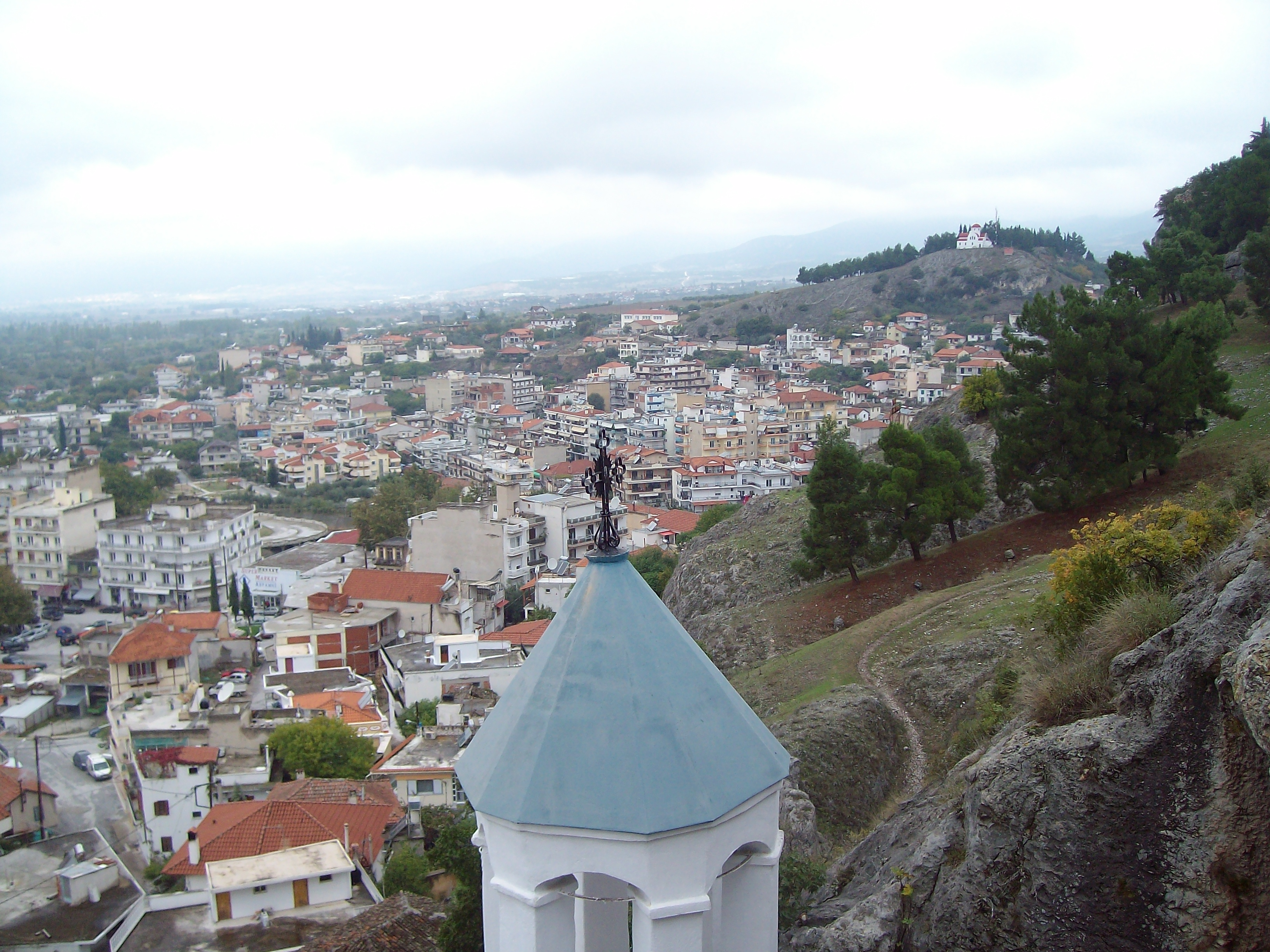
- General view of Valovishta
Date	7 November 1185
Location	Demetritzes (Sidirokastro, Greece)
Result	Byzantine victory

Belligerents
Byzantine Empire	Kingdom of Sicily

Commanders and leaders
Alexios Branas	Count Baldwin (POW); Count Richard of Acerra (POW)

The Battle of Demetritzes in 1185 was fought between the Byzantine army and the Normans of the Kingdom of Sicily, who had recently sacked and captured the Byzantine Empire's second city, Thessalonica. It was a decisive Byzantine victory, which led to the immediate re-occupation of Thessalonica and ended the Norman threat to the Empire.

== Background ==
The fall of Thessalonica and the Norman advance towards Constantinople precipitated the downfall of the Byzantine emperor Andronikos I Komnenos and the elevation of Isaac II Angelos. The elevation of the new emperor led to an influx of volunteers from Byzantine Anatolia to fight the Normans. Isaac armed and paid these troops, and sent them off to join the field army already assembled under the experienced general Alexios Branas, which was placed to block the Norman advance. To the field army he sent 4,000 pounds of gold as pay and as a donative.

The Norman army that had captured Thessalonica was divided into three parts, one part remained in Thessalonica, the main army marched eastwards to the cities of Amphipolis and Serres near the Strymon River, whilst an advanced guard pushed further on the road towards Constantinople, reaching Mosynopolis, which it occupied. Choniates states that the Normans, having encountered little resistance thus far, had become overconfident and reckless. The reinforced Byzantine army under Branas attacked the Norman advanced guard, routing a division of this force and pursuing it back to the town before again defeating it outside its walls. The gates of Mosynopolis were set alight and the Byzantines stormed in, slaughtering the defenders.

== Battle ==
Branas led his army towards the Normans who were laying waste the area around Amphipolis and Serres, contacting them at Demetritzes, which is to the northwest of Serres. Choniates, the main source for the battle, does not describe the conflict in any tactical detail. Instead, he makes much of the confidence that the Byzantine troops had gained from their earlier success at Mosynopolis, and the loss of morale the Normans had suffered for the same reason. The Normans initially offered to negotiate and sue for peace. Branas took this as a sign of weakness and cowardice. On the 7 November the Byzantine army launched a sudden attack on the Normans and routed them. The Normans received the initial attack with some success, but, after a varying contest, they gave way before the impetuous Byzantine assault and fled. Some were cut down in flight, others driven into the Strymon, many were taken prisoner. The Byzantine victory was complete; the Norman leaders, Count Richard d'Accera and Count Baldwin (or Aldoin), both being made captive. Also captured was Alexios Komnenos, once the imperial pinkernes ("cupbearer"), an illegitimate son of Byzantine emperor Manuel I Komnenos. He had served as a figurehead for the Normans, who used the pretext of supporting his claim to the imperial throne as a means to claim legitimacy for their invasion.

== Aftermath ==
Pursued by the Byzantines, the surviving Normans fled to Thessalonica, which was abandoned without battle; the remnants of the Norman army fled by sea with many ships being subsequently lost to storms. Any Normans who did not manage to escape from Thessalonica were massacred by the Alan troops of the Byzantine army in revenge for the deaths of their kinsmen when the city was sacked. The Norman fleet under Tancred of Lecce, which was in the Sea of Marmara, also withdrew. The city of Dyrrhachium on the Adriatic coast was the only part of the Balkans that remained in Norman hands and this fell the following Spring after a siege, effectively ending the attempted Sicilian conquest of the Empire. The Kingdom of Sicily had suffered enormous losses in killed and captured. More than four thousand captives were sent to Constantinople, where they suffered great mistreatment at the hands of Isaac II.

== Sources ==
- Angold, Michael (1984). The Byzantine Empire, 1025–1204: A Political History (First ed.). London and New York: Longman. ISBN 0-582-49060-X.
- Brown, P. (2016) Mercenaries to Conquerors: Norman Warfare in the Eleventh and Twelfth-Century Mediterranean, Pen and Sword.
- Choniates, N.: Magoulias, Harry J., ed. (1984). O City of Byzantium. Annals of Niketas Choniates. Detroit: Wayne State University Press. ISBN 0-8143-1764-2.
