= List of banks in Monaco =

The following is a list of banks incorporated in Monaco:

== Major ==
- Barclays Bank plc Monaco
- Credit Foncier de Monaco SWIFT: CFMOMCMXXXX
- Bank Julius Baer (Monaco) S.A.M.
- UBS (Monaco) SWIFT: UBSWMCMXXXX
- SG Private Banking (Monaco) SWIFT: SGBTMCMCXXX
- Credit Suisse (Monaco) SWIFT: CRESMCMXXXX
- EFG Eurofinancière d'Investissements SWIFT: EFGBMCMCXXX
- Compagnie Monégasque de Banque SWIFT: CMBMMCMXXXX
- Banque de Gestion Edmond de Rothschild - Monaco SWIFT: BERLMCMCXXX
- BNP Paribas Private Bank Monaco SWIFT: BPPBMCMCXXX
- HSBC Private Bank (Monaco) SWIFT: BLICMCMCXXX
- Union Bancaire Privée SWIFT: UBPGMCMXXXX

== Other ==
- Banque J. Safra (Monaco) SWIFT: BJSBMCMXXXX
- Banque Havilland SWIFT: HAVLMCMXXX
- BSI Monaco SWIFT: BSILMCMCXXX
- Crédit Mobilier de Monaco (SWIFT: CMMDMCM1XXX not connected)
- Fortis Banque Monaco SWIFT: FTSBMCMCXXX
- ING Bank (Monaco) SWIFT: INGBMCMCXXX
- KB Luxembourg (Monaco) SWIFT: KBLXMCMCXXX
- Martin Maurel Sella - Banque Privée-Monaco (SWIFT: MMSEMCM1XXX not connected)
- Monte Paschi Monaco SWIFT: MONTMCMCXXX

This is based on official lists of banks registered in Monaco available at the Official Government Portal of Monaco and Monaco Bankers' Association and .

== Defunct banks ==
- Banque Monégasque de Gestion (acquired by EFG International)
- Banque du Gothard (Monaco) (acquired by Bank Jacob Safra Switzerland in 2006)

== See also ==
- List of banks in the euro area
- List of banks in Europe
