= Spiros Latsis =

Greek billionaire and business magnate (born 1946)

Spiros J. Latsis
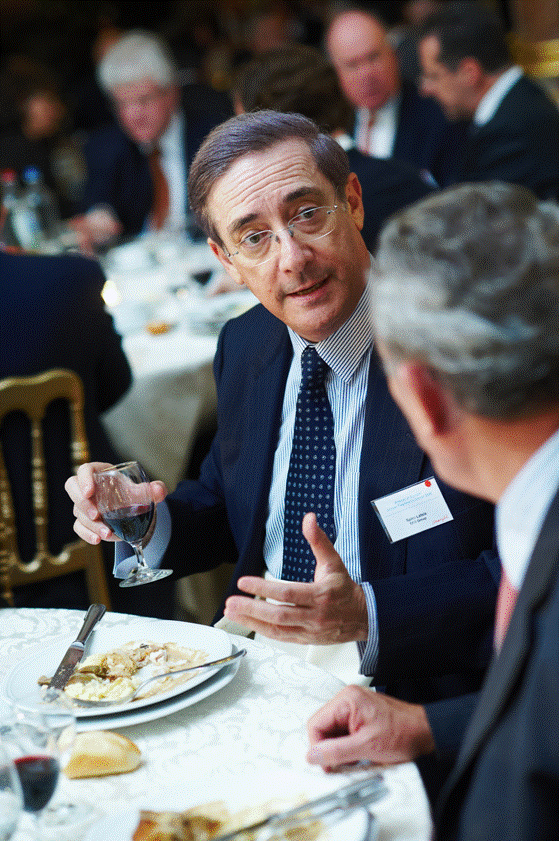
- Born: 15 August 1946 (age 80); Athens, Kingdom of Greece
- Education: London School of Economics (LSE)
- Occupation: Business magnate
- Known for: Owner of EFG International; Major shareholder of Lamda Development; Owner of Paneuropean Oil and Industrial Holdings; Major shareholder of Hellenic Petroleum
- Spouse: Dorothy Baddeley
- Children: 4
- Parent(s): Yiannis Latsis; Erietta Tsoukala

Spiros J. Latsis (Greek: Σπύρος Λάτσης; born 15 August 1946) is a Greek billionaire and business magnate. He is the son of the late tycoon Yiannis Latsis, who died in 2003. In 2018, Spiros Latsis ranked #729 on the Forbes World's Billionaires list, with wealth listed at US $3.2 billion.

== Early life ==
Spiros Latsis was born on 15 August 1946 in Athens is the son of Yiannis Latsis and Erietta Tsoukala. He has two sisters, Marianna and Margarita Latsis. He was educated at the London School of Economics (LSE) where, in 1968, he obtained a bachelor's degree in economics. In 1970, he received a master's degree in logic and scientific method. He went on to pursue his doctorate and obtained a PhD in philosophy from the LSE in 1974. His doctoral advisor was Imre Lakatos.

== Career and family business ==
His father John Latsis started building the family fortune in 1938 as a trader and later a ship-owner. He grew his business into a fleet of ships by the 1960s. He built up a number of business interests in the areas of shipping, real estate, construction and oil, plus banking and finance. Latsis joined the family business initially in the banking arm.

From 1989, Latsis became a director of some companies within the EFG Group, the family banking Holding Group, including Private Financial Holdings Limited which became EFG Private Bank Limited in London, and EFG Consolidated Holding SA in Luxembourg. The following year, he also assumed the role of director of Eurofinanciere d'Investissements SAM in Monaco and became a non-Executive Director of Eurobank Ergasias SA in Athens. Dr Latsis officially assumed the role of Chairman of the EFG Group in 1997.

After the death of his father in 2003, Latsis took over the direction of the Latsis Group of companies. Since that time, Latsis, while remaining Chairman of EFG Bank (the family bank holding company) has become a director of EFG International and Consolidated Lamda Holdings, serves as President of Societe d'Etudes et Economiques in Geneva, and is Chairman of several other companies including Paneuropean Oil and Industrial Holdings S.A. in Luxembourg.

In 2015 Latsis was the second wealthiest Greek, ranked #782 on the 2015 Forbes list of the world's richest people. Latsis saw his wealth significantly decline during Greece's recession, with stocks of his EFG Eurobank, Lamda Development and Hellenic Petroleum all falling significantly in 2011, but recovered in 2013. Latsis invited the President of the European Commission, José Manuel Durão Barroso, who had been a student friend at the University of Geneva, to be a guest on his yacht. Subsequently, allegations were made in the press that this influenced the Commissions decisions but Barroso dismissed those.

In 2020 Latsis was officially dropped off by the Forbes world's richest people list.

== Business interests ==
The family's largest holding is its EFG Bank European Financial Group in Luxembourg, a private banking group that operates in many jurisdictions. The Group holds over 40% of EFG International listed in Switzerland on the Zurich Stock Exchange, which is a global private banking group offering private banking and asset management services. EFGI's group of private banking businesses operates in around 30 locations worldwide, with 3,151 employees and manages CHF153.8bn of client assets as of December 2019.

The Latsis family fortune, managed by Spiro Latsis, includes more than 42% in Hellenic Petroleum, a major petroleum player in Southern Europe, through its ownership of Paneuropean Oil and Industrial Holdings S.A.. The Latsis group also controls Lamda Development, a real estate group based in Athens. Lamda Development projects include The Mall Athens, which opened in 2005, and Golden Hall Mall, also in Athens. Latsis also started PrivateAir, a jet charter service with over 50 planes in its repertoire serving affluent European and American travelers, and which he has since sold.

== Controversies ==
=== Swiss Federal Prosecutor's Office investigation ===
In June 2024, it was reported that the family office of Spiros Latsis in Geneva had been raided in November 2023 as part of a Swiss Federal Prosecutor's Office inquiry into suspected money laundering and bribery cases. According to the Swiss website Gotham City, the investigation involved two companies controlled by the Latsis family: Hardstone Services SA and Société d'études techniques et économiques (SETE) SA, which manages the Latsis family's assets.

The investigation, which began on 15 January 2020, reportedly concerns suspected bribery of Fahad Al Rajaan, the former director of Kuwait's Public Institution for Social Security (PIFSS). Al Rajaan, who is now deceased, allegedly received commissions in exchange for awarding mandates to manage public funds to several Swiss banks. The companies SETE SA and Hardstone Services SA are alleged to have paid commissions to offshore companies, with some funds allegedly ending up in an account of a person who was a front for Al Rajaan in the Bahamas.

According to SETE's press release and statements from their legal representative, neither Spiros Latsis nor the two companies under investigation are directly involved in the investigation or have been charged with any offense by the Swiss Federal Public Prosecutor's Office.

== Honours, recognition, and philanthropy ==
In 2006 Latsis received an honorary doctorate from Witten/Herdecke University in Witten, Germany recognizing his work in the field of economics.

In addition to his various business holdings, Latsis (with his family) helps to fund the John S. Latsis Public Benefit Foundation and the International Latsis Foundation in Geneva. In 2012, he transferred around $300 million of his Greek banking stock holdings to various members of the Latsis family, with a contribution also going to the Foundation.

The John S. Latsis Public Benefit Foundation helps to fund programs in the areas of education, scientific research, social welfare, and culture. The Geneva Foundation funds five scientific awards per annum as well as a number of conferences at the Swiss Polytechnic Institutes in Lausanne and Zurich as well as the University of Geneva.
