= Celadon (river) =

The Celadon is a mythological river of Arcadia crossed by Heracles in pursuit of the Hind of Ceryneia, according to Pindar: it is mentioned by Strabo. Pausanias names it the Celadus and states that it is a tributary of the Alpheus. As stated in Callimachus, Hymn 3 to Artemis 98 ff (trans. Mair) (Greek poet C3rd B.C.), it is said that when Heracles was venturing for the Golden Hind, one of them escaped over the river and then Heracles had to give chase.

In Homer's Iliad it is described as being under the walls of Pheia, not far from the river Iardanus, on the borders of Pylos: Ereuthalion was killed by Nestor here.
