= Iardanos (river in Elis) =

The Iardanos or Iardanus (Greek: Ιάρδανος, Ancient Greek: Ἰάρδανος) is a river in Greece which flows into the Ionian Sea at the Monastery of Skafidia, north of Katakolo, in Elis. It is apparently the same as the river, referred to in Homer's Iliad as being near Pheia in ancient Elis. Homer has Nestor the legendary king of Pylos recall seeing, as a young man, the Pylians and Arcadians fighting by the river Celadon:

beneath the walls of Pheia, about the streams of Iardanus.

Strabo describing the coast of Elis, says:

After Chelonatas comes the long seashore of the Pisatans; and then Cape Pheia. And there was also a small town called Pheia: "beside the walls of Pheia, about the streams of Iardanus," for there is also a small river near by. According to some, Pheia is the beginning of Pisatis.

While describing the river Anigrus in Elis that descends from Mount Lapithas, the geographer Pausanias, possibly referring to this river, reports having "heard from an Ephesian" that the Acidas, a tributary of the Anigrus, "was called Iardanus in ancient times", adding that "I repeat [this], though I have nowhere found evidence in support of it."
