= Olympia station =

Olympia station may refer to:

- Olympia railway station, Olympia, Greece
- Kensington (Olympia) station, London, England
- Centennial Station, Olympia-Lacey, Washington, United States
