= Yiannis Latsis =

Greek shipping multi-billionaire business magnate (1910–2003)

- Γιάννης Λάτσης
- Born: Ioannis Latsis; 14 September 1910; Katakolo, Greece
- Died: 17 April 2003 (aged 92); Ekali, Greece
- Other name: John Latsis
- Occupation: Business magnate
- Known for: Owner of Latsis Group
- Spouse: Erietta Tsoukala (m. 1940)
- Children: 3, including Spiros and Marianna

Ioannis "Yiannis" Latsis (Greek: Ιωάννης «Γιάννης» Λάτσης; 14 September 1910 – 17 April 2003), also known as captain Yiannis, was a Greek shipping multi-billionaire business magnate notable for his great wealth, influential friends, and charitable activities.

The year of his death (2003), Forbes magazine ranked Yiannis Latsis number 101 on its list of the world's richest people, with a fortune estimated at $6.4 billion.

== Biography ==
Latsis was born in Katakolo, a fishing village in the Elis. His family was from the Greek community in Albania. He was the sixth of nine children, the son of Spiro Latsis and Aphrodite Efthimiou. He was educated at the Pyrgos School of Commerce and the Merchant Marine Academy (Greece).

He started as a deckhand, eventually working his way up to ship's captain in the merchant marine. After the Second World War, Latsis expanded his activities into coastal shipping with the purchase of used passenger vessels. The most renowned of these vessels was the Neraida (ex-Laurana), an Italian-built passenger ship that was routed in the coastal line of the Argo-Saronic Gulf from 1950 to 1974. Today, she is a floating museum dedicated to her owner's business history.

He bought his first cargo vessel in 1938 and by the 1960s, owned a fleet of ships. In 1955, Latsis purchased a cargo vessel, the Marianna. Three years later, he purchased his first oil tanker, the Spyros, which was used for the transportation of liquid molasses from Egypt to Greece and the UK. In the following years, his fleet expanded significantly, with the acquisition of passenger vessels, cargo ships and oil tankers. In the 1990s, Latsis’ fleet was one of the largest under Greek ownership.

In the late 1960s, he diversified his business to include oil – establishing Petrola in 1975 — and construction, building (among other things) oil refineries in Greece and Saudi Arabia, before gradually expanding into banking and financial services.

Latsis also invested in yacht management and established a private airline, LatsisAir (later renamed PetrolAir). In the early 1980s, he made his first investment in the banking sector, with the acquisition of the Banque de Dépôt, a small bank based in Geneva. Banque de Dépôt eventually evolved into EFG International Bank, one of the largest Swiss private banks listed on the Zurich stock exchange.

His European Financial Group owns banks in the United Kingdom, Switzerland, Monaco, the Channel Islands and Greece.

In 1990, he hosted the G7 Economic Conference at Bridgewater House, Westminster, London. He was a close friend of Charles, Prince of Wales, twice loaning him the use of his yacht Alexandros, firstly in 1991 for a second honeymoon with Diana, Princess of Wales, and secondly in 2002 for a cruise with Camilla Parker Bowles. Others to whom he lent the ship included former US President George H. W. Bush, Colin Powell and Marlon Brando. He also maintained close ties with the Saudi royal family.

Latsis donated £5 million to the British Conservative Party during his business career.

== Business empire ==
The Latsis commercial empire has been closely involved with German firm Hochtief in both constructing and managing Spata airport. Through Hellenic Petroleum, one of Greece's largest oil companies – in which another partner is the Russian oil giant LUKoil – it holds the contract for all fuel supplies to the airport, through an EU-funded pipeline built by a Latsis engineering company. Hellenic Petroleum, according to its own accounts, in 2000, paid $912 million to acquire a 34 percent interest in the Athens Airport Fuel Pipeline Company.

A Latsis company also has a 50 percent stake in the huge contract for running most of the airport's "ground-handling" services – almost everything except control of the aircraft themselves.

Latsis's development arm, Lamda, is a partner with Hochtief in a series of vast, part-EU funded motorway projects across Greece, as part of the "Trans European Network". And between 1999 and 2004, during the time when Spata airport was completed, the commission last week revealed that the giant EFG Eurobank Ergasias banking group, controlled by Latsis family interests, held an exclusive contract to handle all EU structural funds coming to Greece, totalling €28 billion.

== Philanthropy ==
His charitable works began with the establishment of the Latsis Scholarships Institute in 1970 and also included the provision of aid to earthquake victims and the creation of the Latsis Foundation. Two years after his passing in 2003, his immediate family founded the John S. Latsis Public Benefit Foundation in his memory, that undertook the activity of the aforementioned scholarship fund and all the philanthropic work of the family.

== Awards ==
He was awarded the Golden Cross from the Ecumenical Patriarchate of Constantinople and the Grand Cross of the Order of the Phoenix by Greece.

== Personal life ==
Latsis married Erietta Tsoukala. They had three children: Spiros, Marianna and Margarita. Spiros is a trustee of the Friends of Europe, an EU-wide lobbying organisation for greater political integration. His grandson Paris Latsis (son of Marianna) was the former fiancé of Paris Hilton.
