= List of banks in Europe =

This article lists the largest banks in Europe ranked by total assets, and provides links to lists of banks in individual European jurisdictions.

== Largest banks in Europe ==
The 50 largest banks in Europe by S&P Global Market Intelligence total assets report, as of December 31, 2025.

Rank	Bank name	Total assets (US$ billion)	Headquarters city
1 ▲	(France) BNP Paribas	3,279.30	Paris
2 ▼	(United Kingdom) HSBC	3,212.35	London
3	(France) Crédit Agricole	3,148.91	Paris
4	(Spain) Banco Santander	2,251.97	Santander (legal); Madrid (operations)
5	(United Kingdom) Barclays	2,078.28	London
6	(France) Groupe BPCE	1,986.83	Paris
7	(France) Société Générale	1,813.02	Paris
8 ▲	(Germany) Deutsche Bank	1,684.94	Frankfurt
9 ▼	(Switzerland) UBS	1,617.43	Zürich
10	(France) Crédit Mutuel	1,441.94	Paris
11	(United Kingdom) Lloyds Banking Group	1,270.62	Edinburgh (legal); London (operations)
12	(Netherlands) ING Group	1,238.00	Amsterdam
13	(Italy) Intesa Sanpaolo	1,127.02	Turin (legal); Milan (operations)
14 ▲	(Italy) UniCredit	1,021.77	Milan
15 ▲	(Spain) BBVA	1,005.77	Bilbao (legal); Madrid (operations)
16 ▼	(United Kingdom) NatWest Group	961.71	Edinburgh
17 ▼	(United Kingdom) Standard Chartered	919.96	London
18 ▲	Sberbank of Russia	870.03	Moscow
19 ▼	(France) La Banque Postale	851.81	Paris
20	(Spain) CaixaBank	779.66	Barcelona
21 ▼	(Germany) DZ Bank	776.59	Frankfurt
22	(Finland) Nordea Bank	768.29	Helsinki
23 ▼	(Netherlands) Rabobank	750.13	Utrecht
24 ▼	(Germany) Commerzbank	692.84	Frankfurt
25	(Denmark) Danske Bank	590.16	Copenhagen
26 ▲	(Austria) Erste Group	518.50	Vienna
27	(Netherlands) ABN AMRO	510.65	Amsterdam
28 ▼	(United Kingdom) Nationwide Building Society	507.39	Swindon
29 ▼	(Belgium) KBC Group	471.89	Brussels
30 ▲	(Russia) VTB Bank	466.33	Moscow
31 ▼	(Germany) Landesbank Baden-Württemberg	407.77	Stuttgart
32	Raiffeisen Gruppe Switzerland	407.32	St. Gallen
33 ▼	(Sweden) SEB Group	398.24	Stockholm
34 ▲	(Sweden) Handelsbanken	367.52	Stockholm
35 ▼	(Norway) DNB Bank	366.57	Oslo
36 ▲	(Sweden) Swedbank	332.29	Stockholm
37 ▼	(Germany) Bayerische Landesbank	325.11	Munich
38	(Denmark) Nykredit	315.42	Copenhagen
39 ▲	(Italy) Banca Monte dei Paschi di Siena	283.72	Siena
40	(Switzerland) Zurich Cantonal Bank	260.01	Zürich
41	(Austria) Raiffeisen Bank International	257.89	Vienna
42	(Italy) Banco BPM	241.75	Milan (registered); Verona (general)
43 ▲	(Italy) BPER Banca	240.28	Modena
44 ▼	(Spain) Banco Sabadell	227.17	Sabadell
45 ▼	(Belgium) Belfius	226.44	Brussels
46	(Russia) Gazprombank	224.02	Moscow
47 ▼	(Turkey) Ziraat Bank	216.64	Istanbul
48 ▼	(Finland) OP Financial Group	193.54	Helsinki
49 ▼	(Republic of Ireland) Bank of Ireland	193.49	Dublin
50 ▼	(Republic of Ireland) Allied Irish Banks	173.95	Dublin

The methodology underlying that list does not take into account the specific features of institutional protection schemes in some European countries. Specifically in Germany, the Sparkassen-Finanzgruppe disclosed combined total German assets of €2.5 trillion euros at end-2023, and the Cooperative Financial Group disclosed consolidated assets of €1.6 trillion. Considered as groups, these two would therefore have featured among the top ten in the above list.

== Jurisdiction-specific lists ==
- List of banks in Albania
- List of banks in Andorra
- List of banks in Armenia
- List of banks in Austria
- List of banks in Azerbaijan
- List of banks in Belarus
- List of banks in Belgium
- List of banks in Bosnia and Herzegovina
- List of banks in Bulgaria
- List of banks in Croatia
- List of banks in Cyprus
- List of banks in the Czech Republic
- List of banks in Denmark
- List of banks in Estonia
- (Europe) List of banks in the euro area
- List of banks in Finland
- List of banks in France
- (Georgia (country)) List of banks in Georgia
- List of banks in Germany
- List of banks in Gibraltar
- List of banks in Greece
- List of banks in Guernsey
- List of banks in Hungary
- List of banks in Iceland
- List of banks in the Republic of Ireland
- List of banks in the Isle of Man
- List of banks in Italy
- List of banks in Jersey
- List of banks in Kosovo
- List of banks in Latvia
- List of banks in Liechtenstein
- List of banks in Lithuania
- List of banks in Luxembourg
- List of banks in North Macedonia
- List of banks in Malta
- List of banks in Moldova
- List of banks in Monaco
- List of banks in Montenegro
- List of banks in the Netherlands
- List of banks in Northern Cyprus
- List of banks in Norway
- List of banks in Poland
- List of banks in Portugal
- List of banks in Romania
- List of banks in Russia
- List of banks in San Marino
- List of banks in Serbia
- List of banks in Slovakia
- List of banks in Slovenia
- List of banks in Spain
- List of banks in Sweden
- List of banks in Switzerland
- List of banks in Turkey
- List of banks in Ukraine
- List of banks in the United Kingdom
  - List of banks in Scotland
- List of banks in Vatican City

== See also ==
- List of banks in Yugoslavia
- Central banks and currencies of Europe
- List of European cooperative banks
- Lists of banks
- Economy of Europe
