= Katakolo =

Katakolo Κατάκολο
- Community
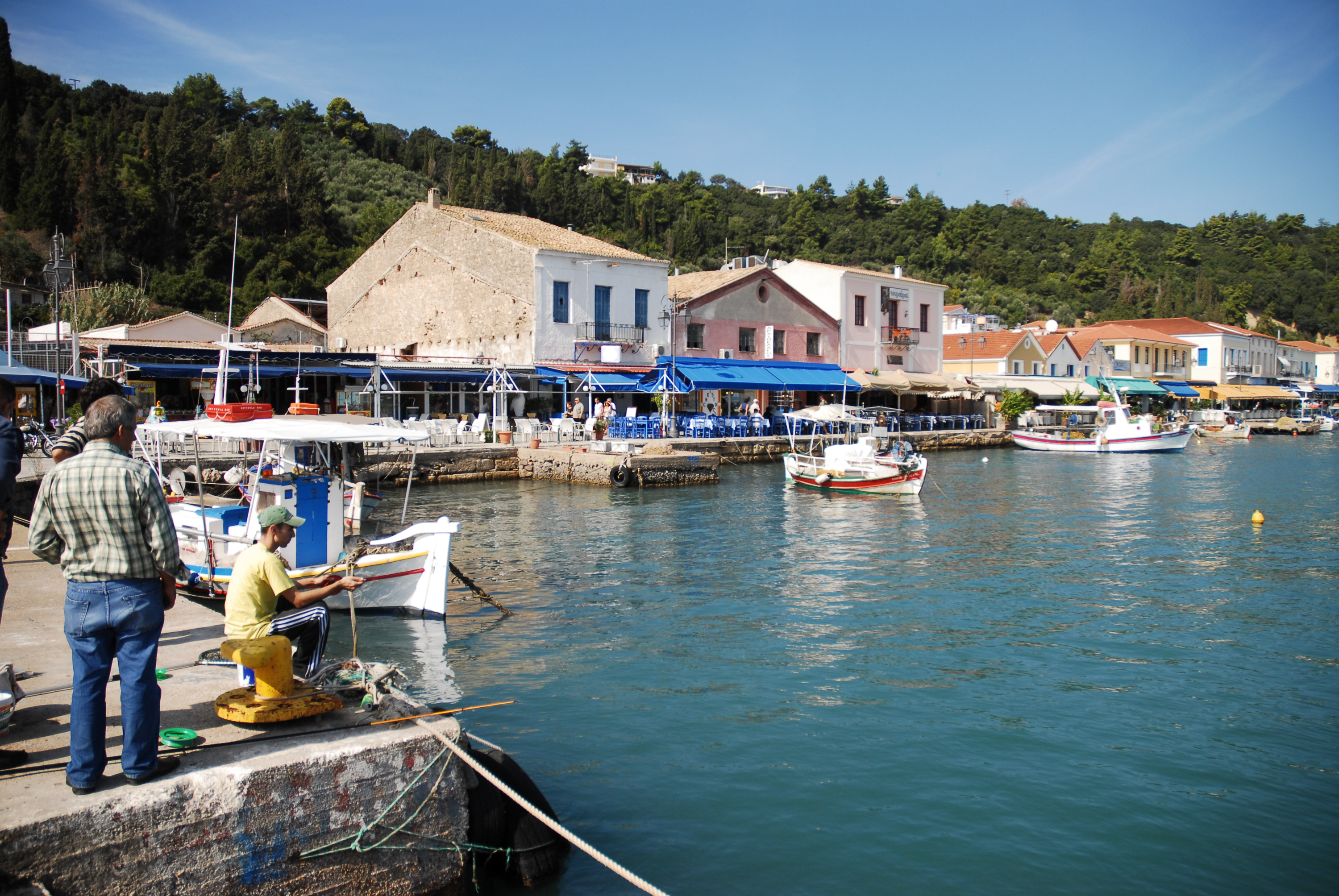
- Promenade of Katakolo

- Location within Greece
- Coordinates: 37°39′N 21°19′E
- Country: Greece
- Administrative region: West Greece
- Regional unit: Elis
- Municipality: Pyrgos
- Municipal unit: Pyrgos

Population (2021)
  - Community: 511
- Time zone: UTC+2 (EET)
  - Summer (DST): UTC+3 (EEST)

Katakolo (Greek: Κατάκολο) is a seaside village in the municipality of Pyrgos in western Elis, Greece. It is situated on a headland overlooking the Ionian Sea and separating the Gulf of Kyparissia from the rest of the Ionian. It is 11 km (6.8 mi) west of Pyrgos. The small village of Agios Andreas, which in ancient times was the natural harbour for Ancient Olympia, lies northwest of Katakolo.

== History ==
In the Middle Ages, Katakolo was the site of the fortress of Pontikon or Pontikokastro (Ποντικόν, Ποντικόκαστρο), which the Frankish rulers of the Principality of Achaea called Beauvoir or Belveder. The fortress was built by the Byzantines and taken over by the Franks ca. 1205.

== Climate ==
Katakolo has a hot-summer Mediterranean climate (Köppen climate classification: Csa), with hot, dry summers and mild winters with significant rainfall.

Climate data for Katakolo
Month	Jan	Feb	Mar	Apr	May	Jun	Jul	Aug	Sep	Oct	Nov	Dec	Year
Mean daily maximum °C (°F)	14.16 (57.49)	14.24 (57.63)	15.49 (59.88)	17.81 (64.06)	21.97 (71.55)	25.85 (78.53)	28.71 (83.68)	29.03 (84.25)	26.60 (79.88)	22.76 (72.97)	18.73 (65.71)	16.06 (60.91)	20.95 (69.71)
Daily mean °C (°F)	11.15 (52.07)	11.12 (52.02)	12.47 (54.45)	15.00 (59.00)	18.88 (65.98)	22.62 (72.72)	25.42 (77.76)	25.63 (78.13)	23.12 (73.62)	19.4 (66.9)	15.83 (60.49)	13.08 (55.54)	17.81 (64.06)
Mean daily minimum °C (°F)	8.00 (46.40)	7.93 (46.27)	8.88 (47.98)	11.05 (51.89)	14.31 (57.76)	17.49 (63.48)	19.69 (67.44)	20.48 (68.86)	18.33 (64.99)	15.44 (59.79)	12.4 (54.3)	9.69 (49.44)	13.64 (56.55)
Average rainfall mm (inches)	124.95 (4.92)	109.12 (4.30)	82.01 (3.23)	41.01 (1.61)	12.27 (0.48)	2.49 (0.10)	2.36 (0.09)	5.38 (0.21)	17.08 (0.67)	73.93 (2.91)	140.53 (5.53)	146.33 (5.76)	757.46 (29.81)
Mean monthly sunshine hours	137.87	145.47	192.92	229.81	293.62	339.19	376.36	336.82	265.03	214.05	151.74	125.47	2,808.35
Source: Hellenic National Meteorological Service

== Visitor attractions ==
The port of Katakolo is a popular stop for cruise ships, offering an opportunity for passengers to visit the site of Olympia. Low hills with forests surround Katakolo. Visitors here have the opportunity to visit the ancient port of Olympia, the sunken ancient city of Pheia. Ancient Pheia was on the other side of the mountain of Ichthys, now Agios Andreas, within walking distance of Katakolo port. The lighthouse of Katakolo was built in 1865. One of the most important sites of Katakolo is the Museum of Ancient Greek Technology.

Katakolo has a big market. It consists of more than sixty shops. Cafeterias, restaurants, clothing and traditional Greek products.

The remains of the medieval Pontikokastro/Belvedere/Beauvoir castle still stand on a hilltop northeast of the modern port, but the castle is mostly ruined and its original appearance can only be surmised.

== Historical population ==
Year	Population of Katakolo
1991	594
2001	601
2011	513
2021	511

== Transport ==
=== Rail ===
A railway station connects Katakolo with Pyrgos and Olympia.

== Notable people ==
- Carolos Cantounis aka. Magic Mizrahi (1983-) Jewish music producer of electronic music, well-known in Latin America & Israel.
- Pavlos Haikalis (1959–) actor and member of parliament
- Yiannis Latsis (1910–2003) shipping tycoon

== Gallery ==
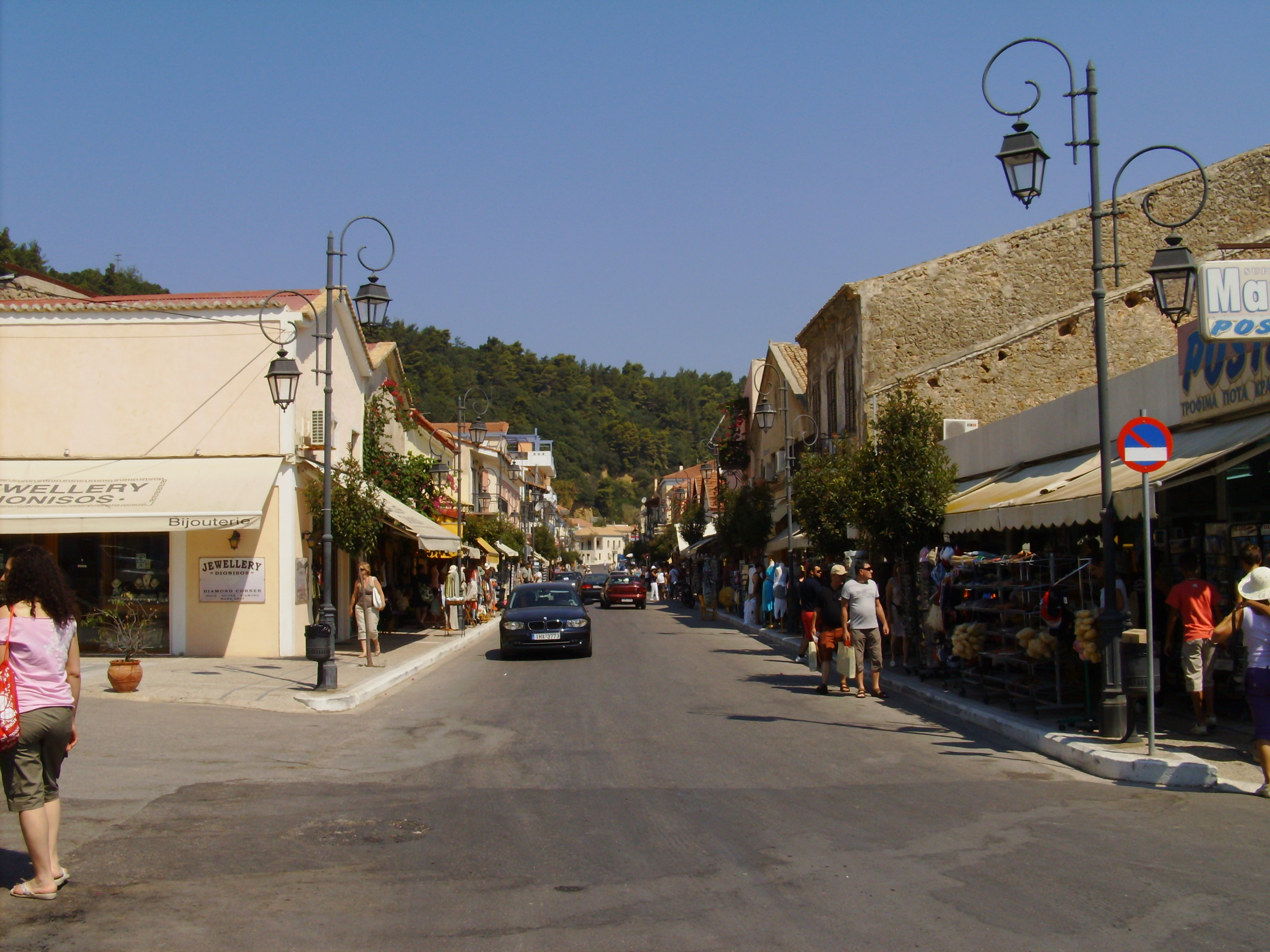
The main street

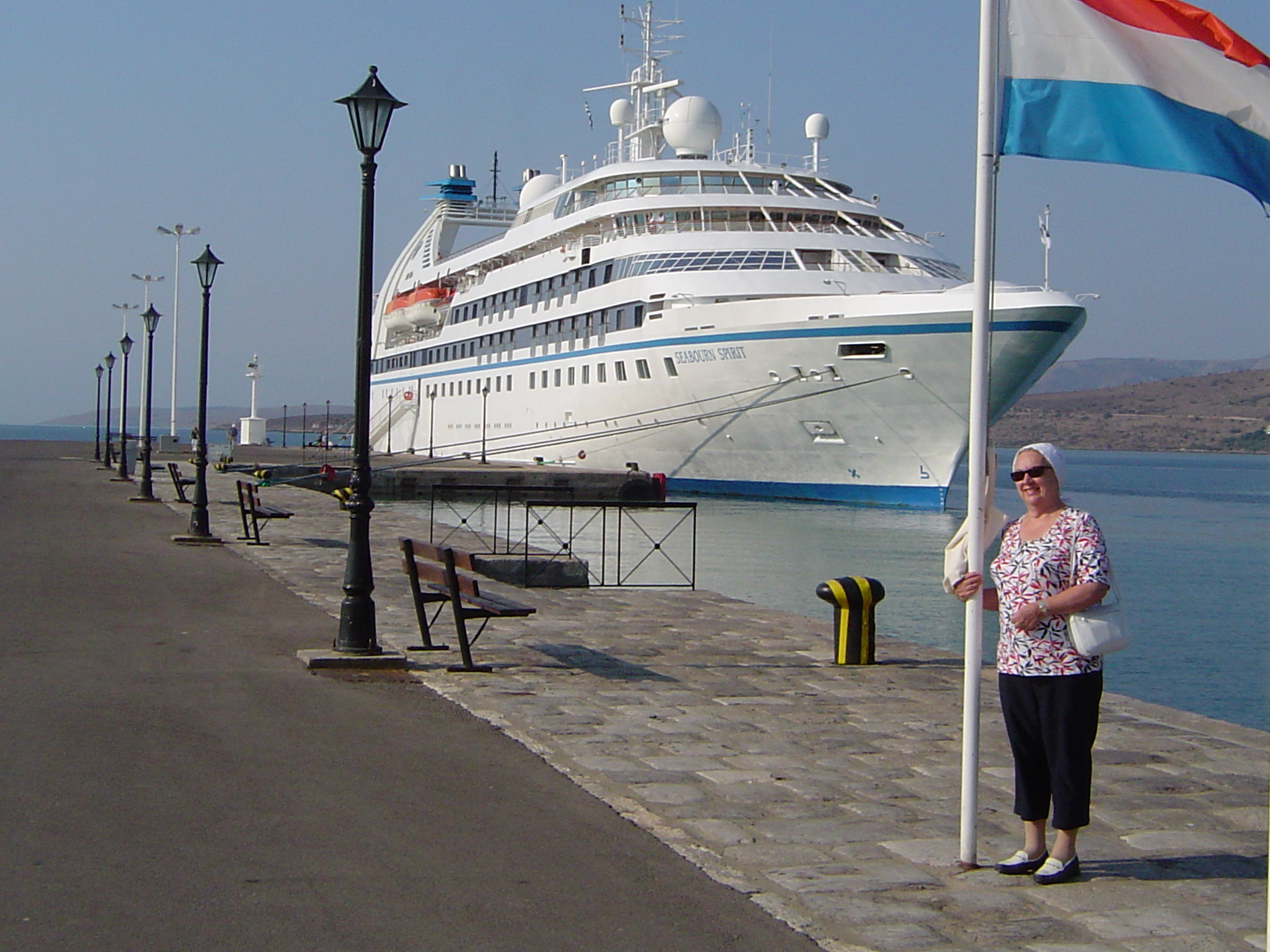
View of harbour

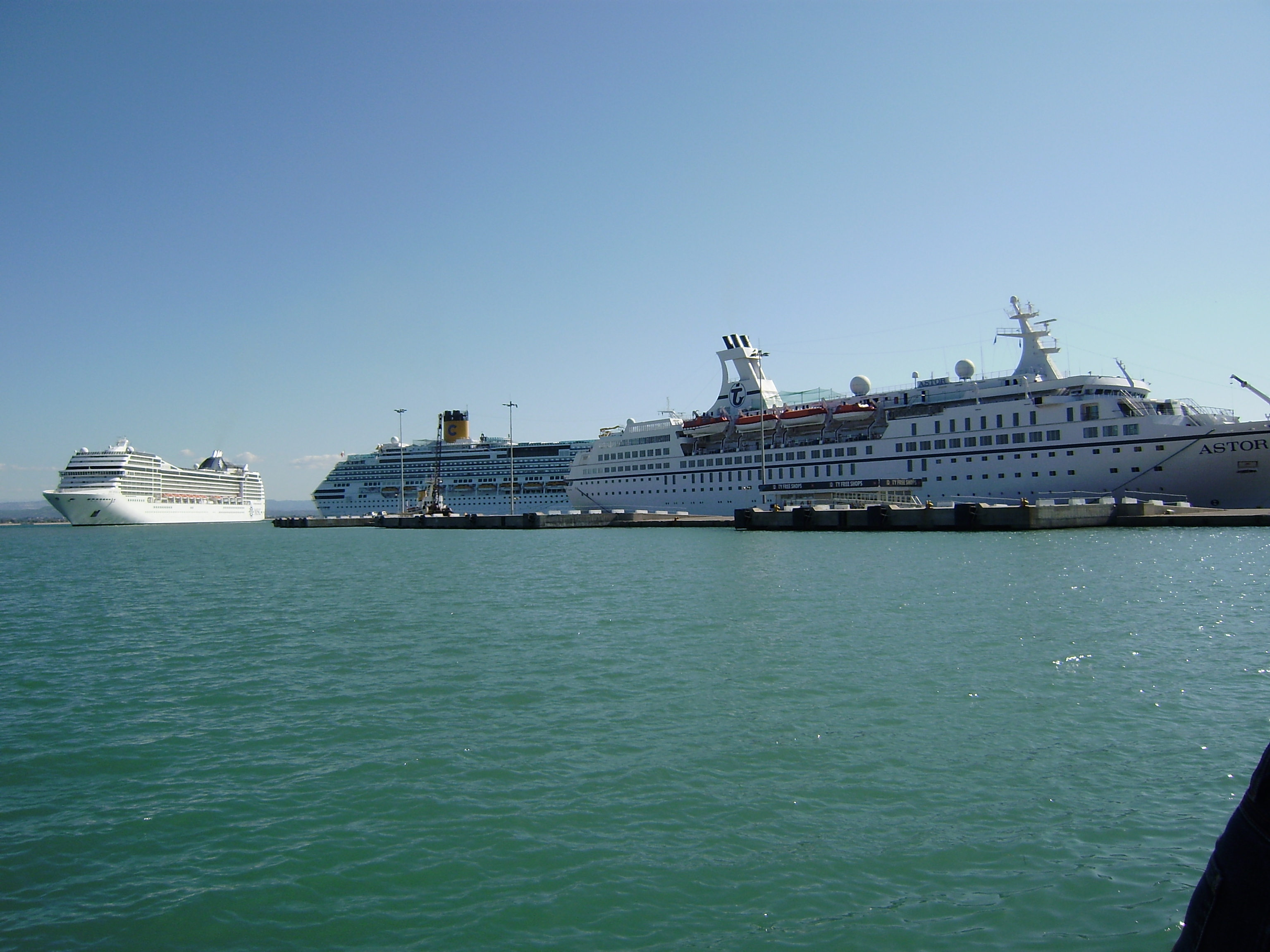
Cruise ships at the harbour

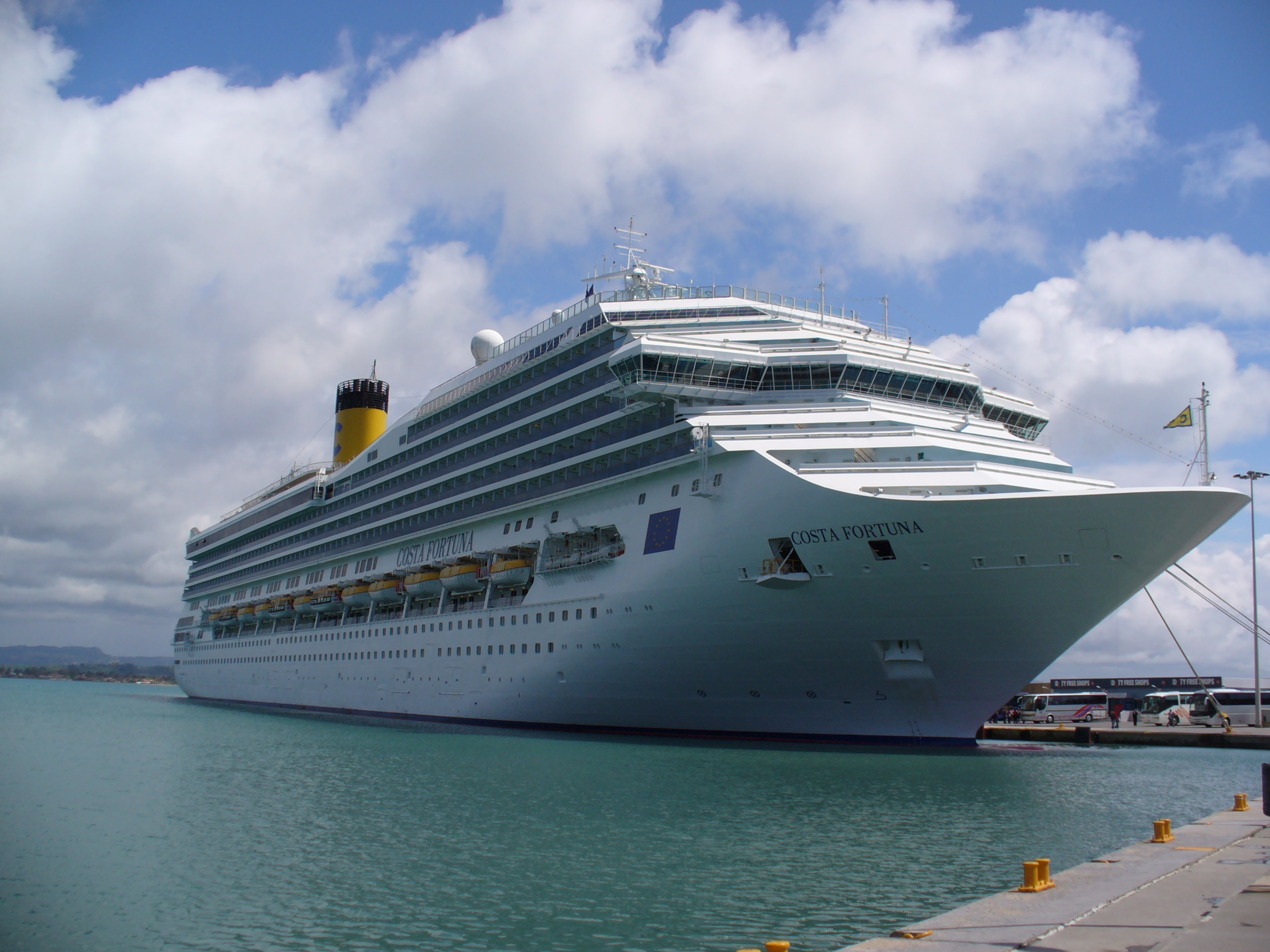
Cruise ship Costa Fortuna in Katakolo, April 2009

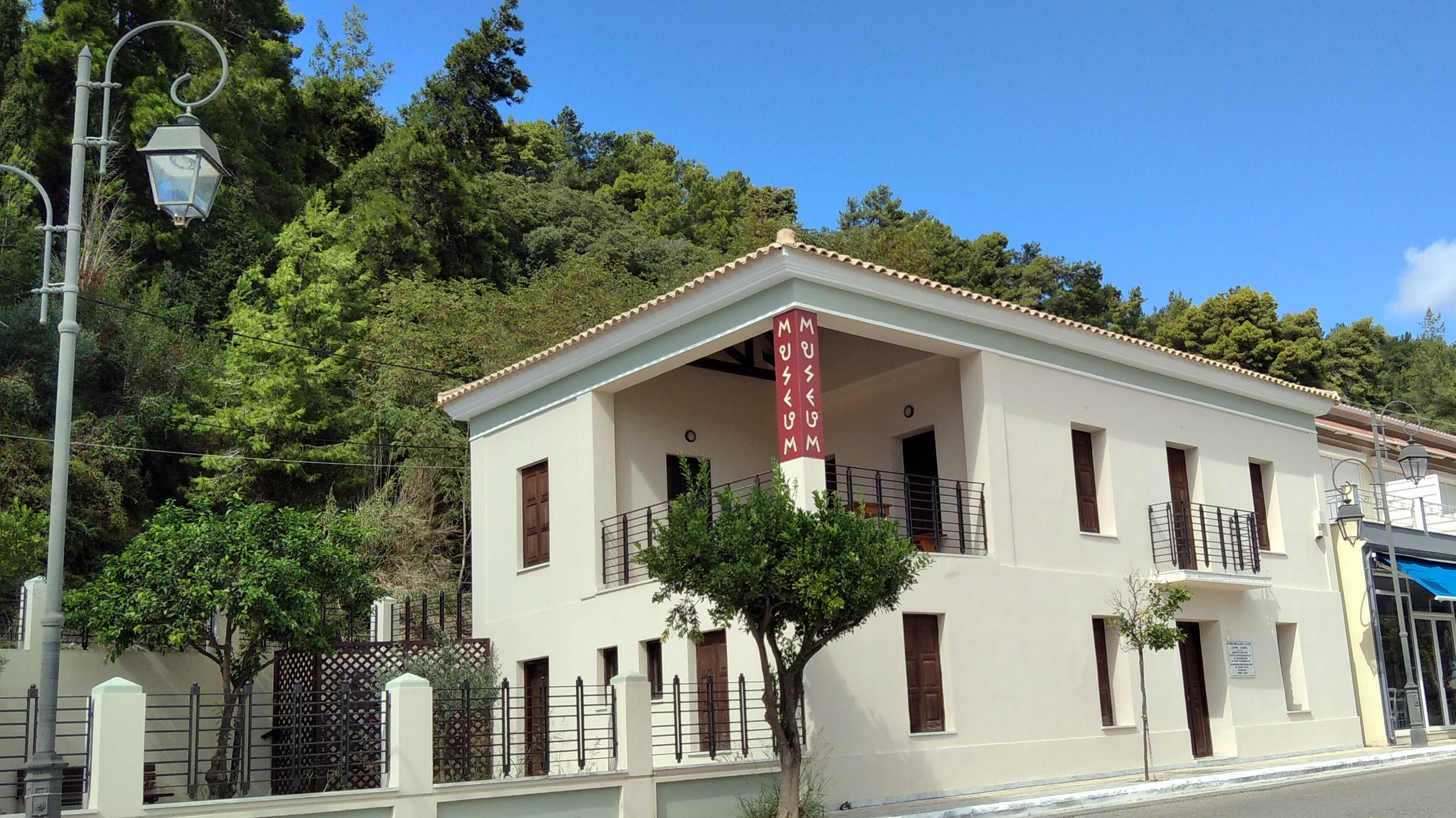
Ioannis Latsis house in Katakolo

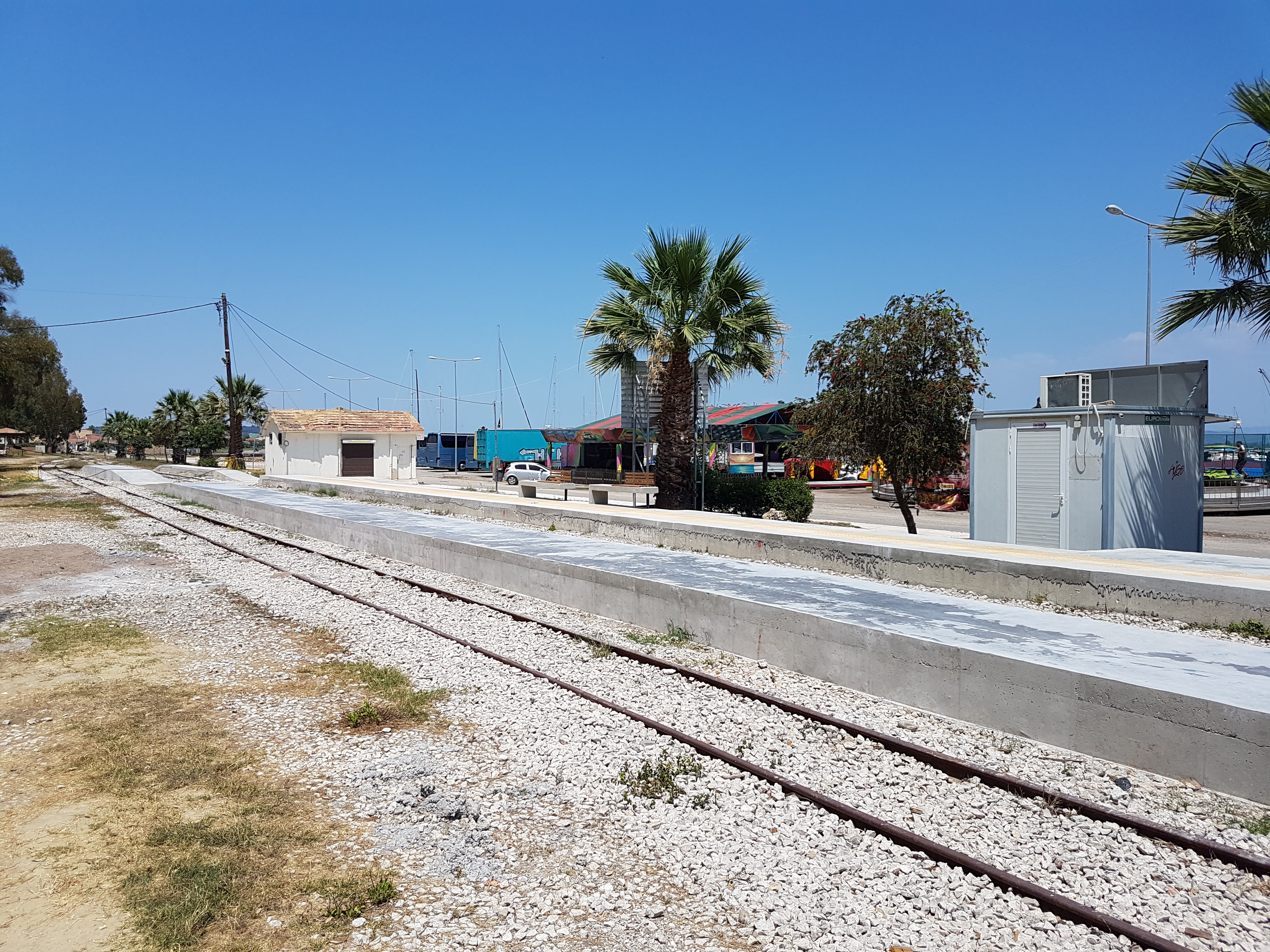
Train station in Katakolo

== See also ==
- List of settlements in Elis
