= Agios Andreas, Katakolo =

Human settlement in Greece

Agios Andreas Άγιος Ανδρέας
- Settlement
- Location within Greece
- Coordinates: 37°39′51″N 21°18′40″E
- Country: Greece
- Administrative region: West Greece
- Regional unit: Elis
- Municipality: Pyrgos
- Municipal unit: Pyrgos
- Community: Katakolo

Population (2021)
  - Total: 9
- Time zone: UTC+2 (EET)
  - Summer (DST): UTC+3 (EEST)
- Postal code: 270 67
- Area code: +30 2621
- Vehicle registration: HA

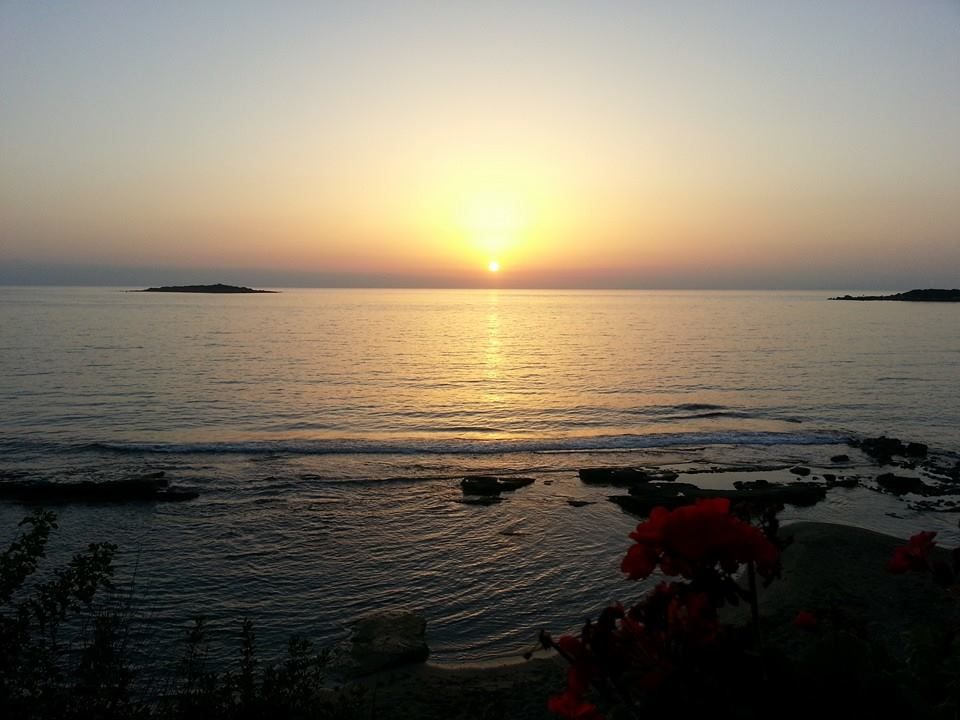
Sunset at Agios Andreas

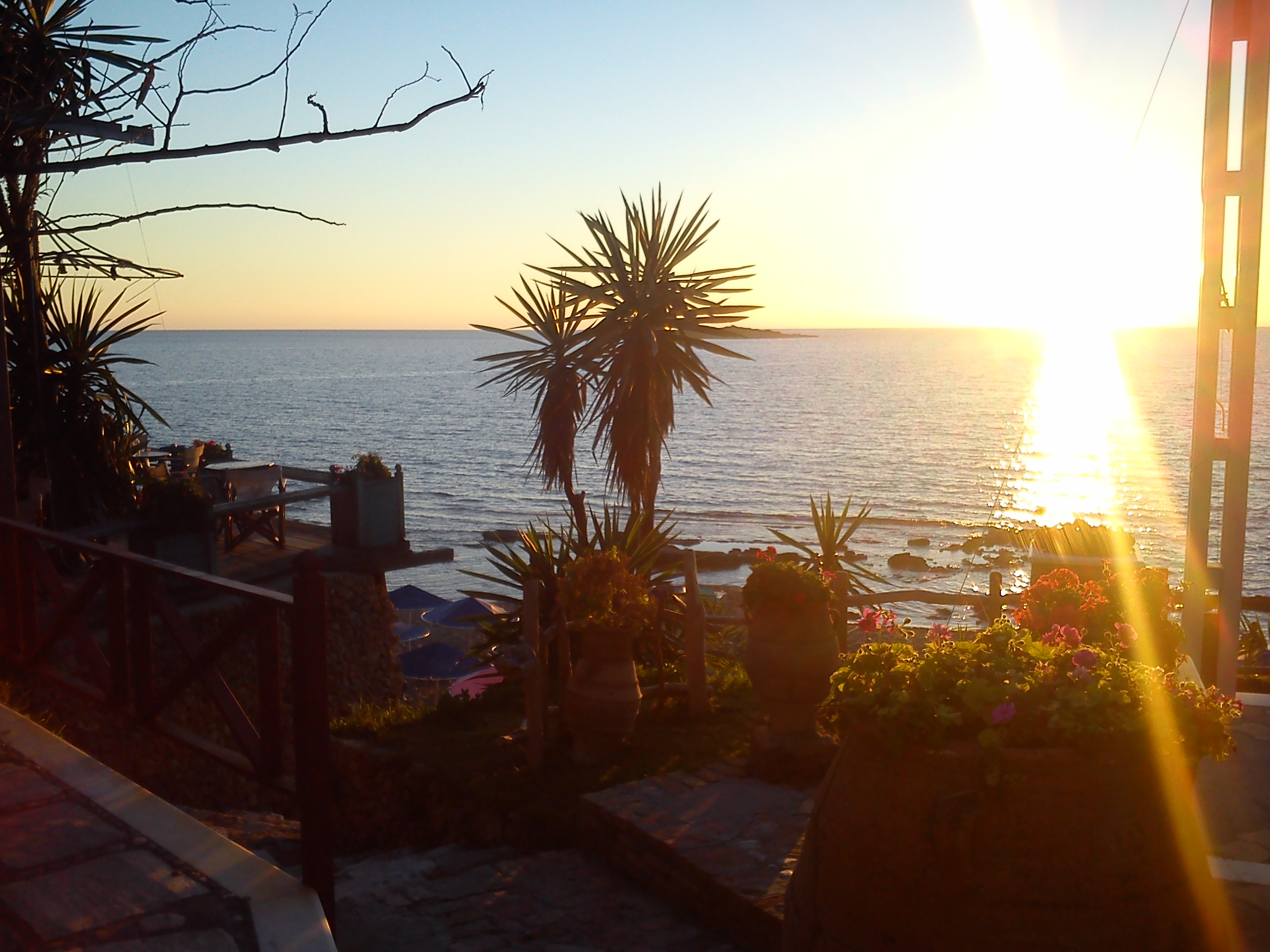
Bars & restaurants in Agios Andreas

Agios Andreas is a small settlement in the municipality of Pyrgos near the town of Katakolo, in Elis, Greece. It is situated on the site of ancient Pheia, at a bay opposite the islet of Ichthys or Tiganonisi and the island of Zakynthos. Agios Andreas is located 13 kilometers northwest of Pyrgos and approximately 2 km from the port of Katakolo. It owes its name to an old church, now ruined, dedicated to Andrew the Apostle, who is said to have passed from the place on his journeys. The church was built on the ruins of an ancient temple, which was rebuilt in 1930.

== History ==
The ancient town of Pheia occupied the site of the modern village of Agios Andreas, most of which today lies submerged in the sea. Dating back to Homeric times, it is mentioned twice by Homer (Iliad, VIII.135, Odyssey, XV.297, 298), Thucydides in his History of the Peloponnesian War (II.25), in Xenophon's Hellenica (3, 2, 30), Strabo's Geographica (VIII.343), as well as the works of Polybius and Pausanias.

Pheia was sunk by an earthquake in the 6th century AD, the same which largely destroyed the city of Patras, and which is credited with the final ruin of the Temple of Zeus at Olympia and probably with the formation of Lake Agoulinitsa (in Epitalio).

In Byzantine times, a fortress, Pontikon or Pontikokastro, was built on the site of the ruined ancient acropolis. Archaeological excavations in the area were undertaken in 1957 by Nikos Gialouris, and the findings are exhibited in the Archaeological Museum of Olympia. They include ostraca from prehistoric up to Roman times, clay lamps, bowls, cylixes, amphorae, columns, an Archaic-era kouros from Naxos, and Cycladic statues, all testimonies to the site's role as a major port. An extensive Roman-era cemetery was also found on the islet of Ιchthys or Tiganonisi. However, most of the graves were found looted.

After the Fourth Crusade, the castle was conquered by the Frankish Crusaders who established the Principality of Achaea in ca. 1205. Known as Beauvoir in French, Belveder in Italian and Bellovidere or Pulchrumvidere in Latin, it originally formed part of the princely domain of Achaea, and along with the fortress and princely mint of Glarentza it was one of the two major sites from which Elis was governed. Beauvoir was granted in 1289 to Hugh, Count of Brienne, in exchange for his half of the Barony of Karytaina, but Hugh soon exchanged it with John Chauderon for lands in Conversano. By 1303, however, it had returned to direct princely control. During Ferdinand of Majorca's attempt to seize the Principality in 1315–16, Beauvoir was captured and held by his forces until after his defeat and death in the Battle of Manolada. Beauvoir ceased to play an important role thereafter, and is scarcely mentioned in the subsequent periods of Ottoman and Venetian rule. In 1391 it was taken over by the Navarrese Company, in 1427 by Constantine Palaiologos, and after that by Thomas Palaiologos. It was burned down by the Turks in 1470.

== See also ==
- Pheia (Elis)
- Pontikokastro

== Sources ==
- Bon, Antoine (1969). La Morée franque. Recherches historiques, topographiques et archéologiques sur la principauté d'Achaïe (in French). Paris: De Boccard.
