= Katakolo railway station =

Railway station in Katakolo, Greece

Κατάκολο Katakolo
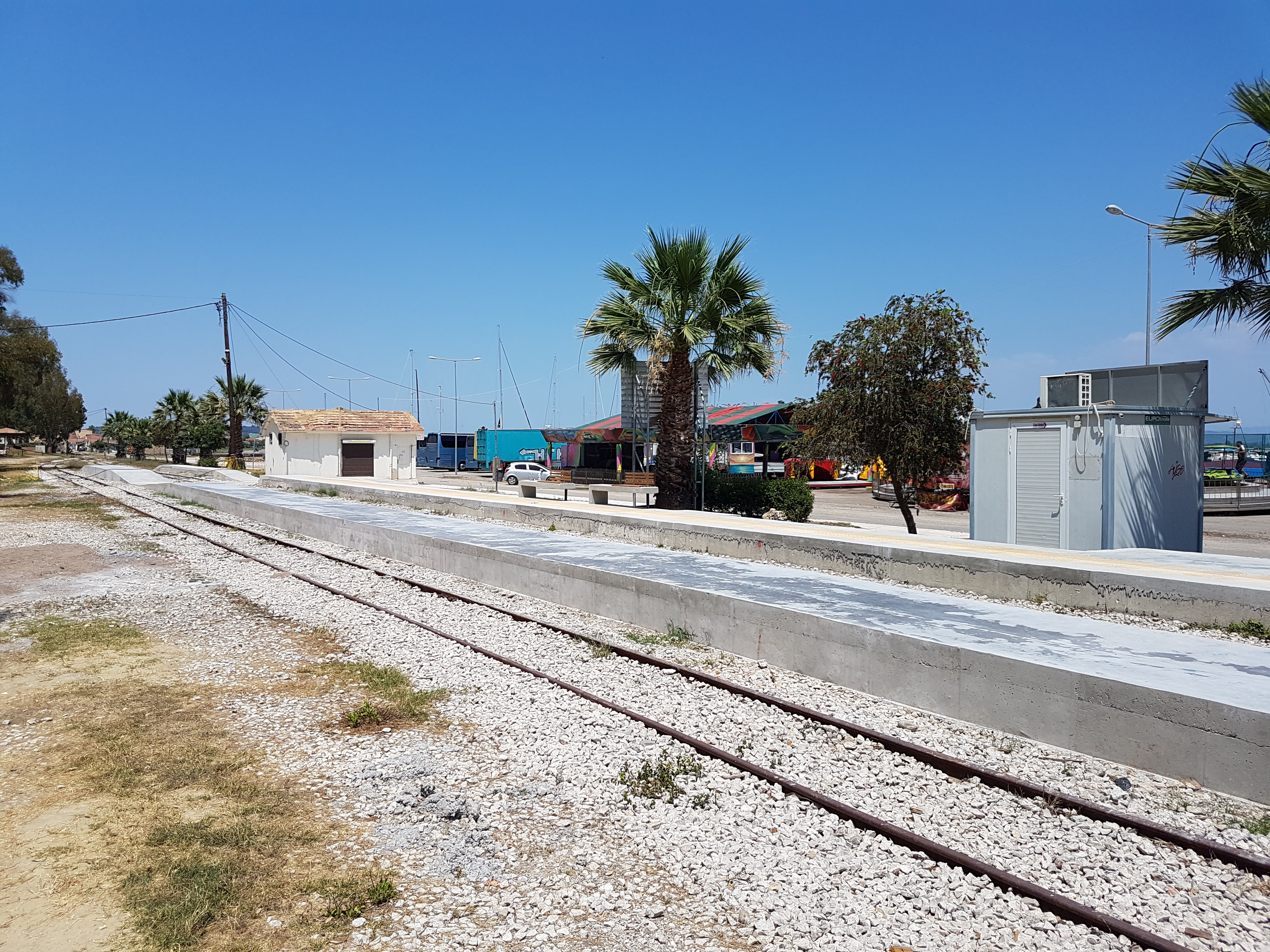
- Train station in Katakolo, July 2021

General information
- Location: Katakolo; 270 67 Pyrgos; Greece
- Coordinates: 37°38′55″N 21°19′00″E
- Owner: GAIAOSE
- Line: Katakolo-Olympia railway
- Platforms: 2 (Island platform)
- Tracks: 2
- Train operators: Hellenic Train Levante Trains

Construction
- Structure type: at-grade
- Platform levels: 1
- Parking: No
- Cycle facilities: No

Other information
- Status: Unstaffed
- Website: http://www.ose.gr/en/

History
- Opened: 1882
- Rebuilt: ?
- Electrified: No

Services
Preceding station	Hellenic Train	Following station
Terminus	Tourist Katakolo–Olympia	Figs towards Olympia
Location
- Location within Greece

Katakolo railway station (Greek: Σιδηροδρομικός Σταθμός Κατακόλου, romanized: Sidirodromikós stathmós Katakolo) is a railway station that serves the town of Katakolo, Elis, Greece. Located in the centre of Katakolo, close to the harbour and ferry port, the station was opened in 1882 by the Pyrgos-Katakolo Railway Company (SPK), (now part of OSE). Today TrainOSE operates 3 scheduled daily Regional trains to Olympia, via Pyrgos. The station is unstaffed however there are waiting rooms available. It was the most western active station on the OSE network.

== History ==
The station opened in 1882 when the Piraeus, Athens and Peloponnese Railways (S.P.A.P.) line was opened. In 1951 the S.P.A.P. absorbed the Line. In 1953 the S.P.A.P. itself was absorbed into the Northwestern Greece Railways (SDBE). In 1962 the station became part of the Hellenic State Railways (SEK). In 1970 OSE became the legal successor to the SEK, taking over responsibilities for most of Greece's rail infrastructure taking over responsibilities for most for Greece's rail infrastructure. On 1 January 1971, the station and most of the Greek rail infrastructure were transferred to the Hellenic Railways Organisation S.A., a state-owned corporation. Freight traffic declined sharply when the state-imposed monopoly of OSE for the transport of agricultural products and fertilisers ended in the early 1990s. Many small stations of the network with little passenger traffic were closed down.

In 2001 the infrastructure element of OSE was created, known as GAIAOSE; it would henceforth be responsible for the maintenance of stations, bridges and other elements of the network, as well as the leasing and the sale of railway assists. In 2005, TrainOSE was created as a brand within OSE to concentrate on rail services and passenger interface. Between 2007 and 2009, the entire rails and cog sections were completely replaced, and four new modern trains were constructed to replace the former carriages. In 2009, with the Greek debt crisis unfolding OSE's Management, was forced to reduce services across the network. Timetables were cutback and routes closed, as the government-run entity attempted to reduce overheads. In 2017 OSE's passenger transport sector was privatised as TrainOSE, currently a wholly owned subsidiary of Ferrovie dello Stato Italiane infrastructure, including stations, remained under the control of OSE. In 2017 the station was refurbished.

In July 2022, the station began being served by Hellenic Train, the rebranded TranOSE. The station is owned by GAIAOSE, which since 3 October 2001 owns most railway stations in Greece: the company was also in charge of rolling stock from December 2014 until October 2025, when Greek Railways (the owner of the Katakolo-Olympia railway) took over that responsibility.

== Facilities ==
The station is only equipped with a large bus ‘like’ shelter on a single short disused side platform, with an Island platform straddling the two tracks, with no digital display screens or timetable poster boards. The station has no toilet facilities; as a result, the station is currently little more than an unstaffed halt. However, infrequent buses do call at the station, and there is a large car park next to the station.

== Services ==
As of 2020, the station is only served by three daily pairs of regional trains to Olympia.

== Station layout ==
L Ground/Concourse	Customer service	Tickets/Exits
Level; L1	Side platform, Disused
Level; L1	Platform 1	towards Olympia (Figs) ←
Level; L1	Island platform, doors will open on the right
Level; L1	Platform 2	towards Olympia (Figs) ←

== Gallery ==
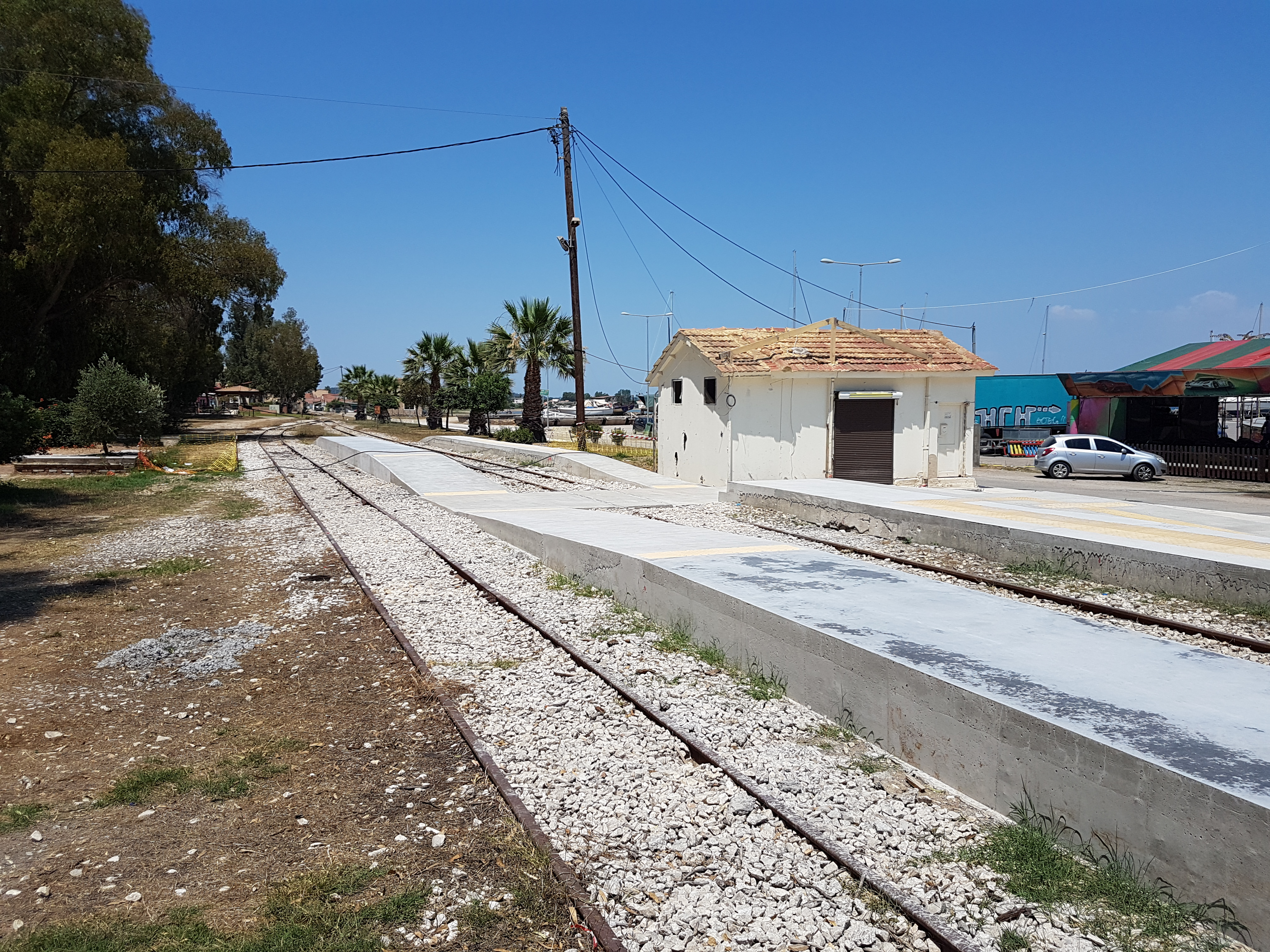

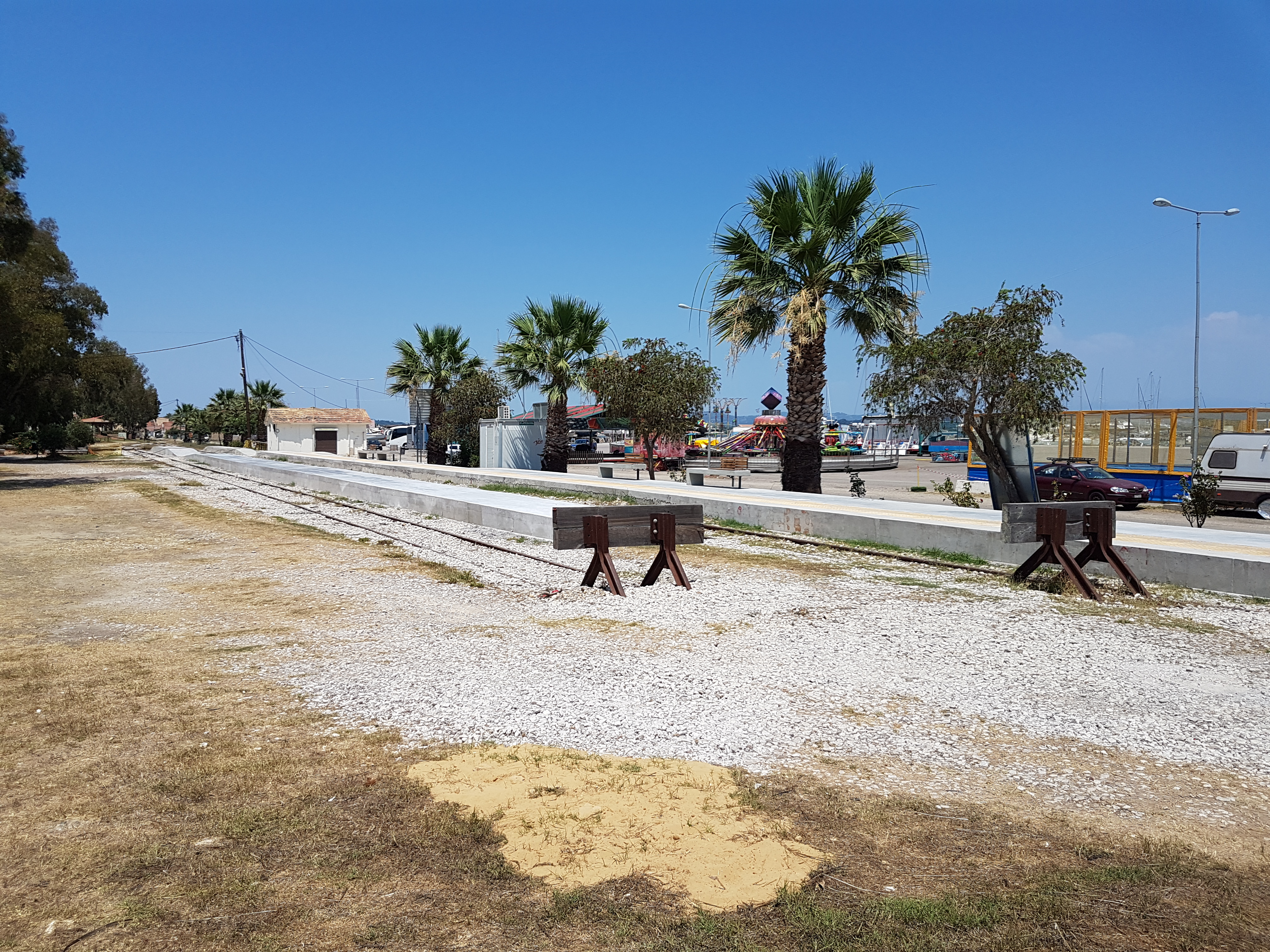

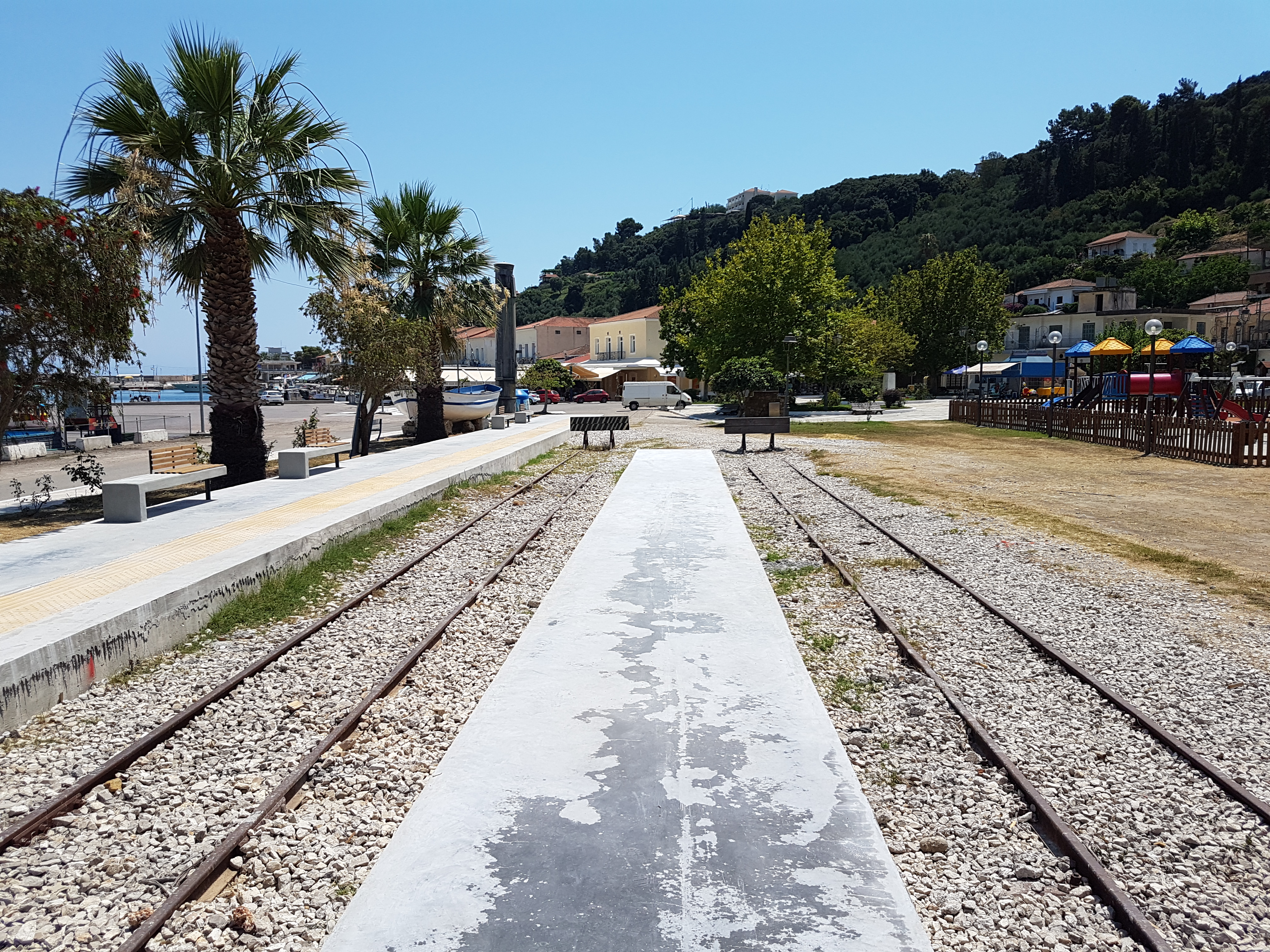

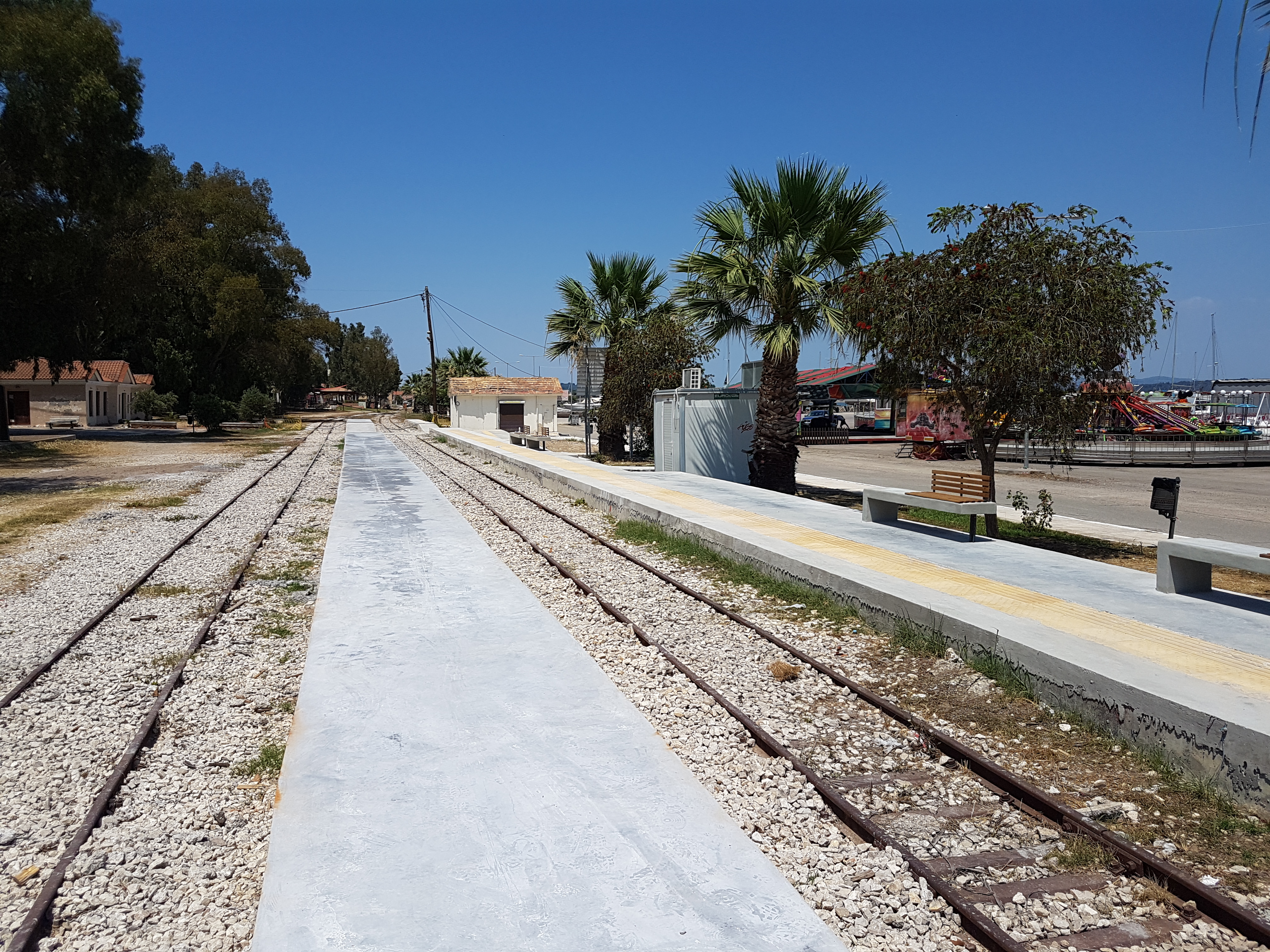
