= List of banks in Georgia (country) =

== Central bank ==
- National Bank of Georgia

== Commercial banks ==
As of May 8, 2022, there are 14 commercial banks operating in Georgia.

Rank	Name	HQ	# branches	Assets Apr 2022 million GEL	Assets Apr 2022 million USD	SWIFT
1	TBC Bank	Tbilisi	159	23,862	7,862	TBCBGE22
2	Bank of Georgia	Tbilisi	276	22,870	7,535	BAGAGE22
3	Liberty Bank (Georgia)	Tbilisi	403	3,250	1,071	LBRTGE22
4	Basis Bank	Tbilisi	24	2,819	929	CBASGE22
5	ProCredit Bank	Tbilisi	9	1,846	608	MIBGGE22
6	Credo Bank	Tbilisi	70	1,787	589	JSCRGE22
7	Terabank	Tbilisi	26	1,372	452	TEBAGE22
8	Cartu Bank	Tbilisi	10	1,370	452	CRTUGE22
9	Halyk Bank	Tbilisi	8	977	322	HABGGE22
10	VTB Bank of Georgia	Tbilisi	30	502	165	UGEBGE22
11	PASHA Bank Georgia	Tbilisi	2	470	155	PAHAGE22
12	Isbank	Tbilisi	2	388	128	ISBKGE22
13	Ziraat Bank	Tbilisi	5	179	59	TCZBGE22
14	Silk Road Bank	Tbilisi	5	92	30	DISNGE22
-	Summary	-	1065	61,786	20,358	-

== Former commercial banks ==
- International Bank of Azerbaijan - Georgia
- Caucasus Development Bank
- FINCA Bank

== See also ==
- List of banks in Europe
