= List of banks in Jersey =

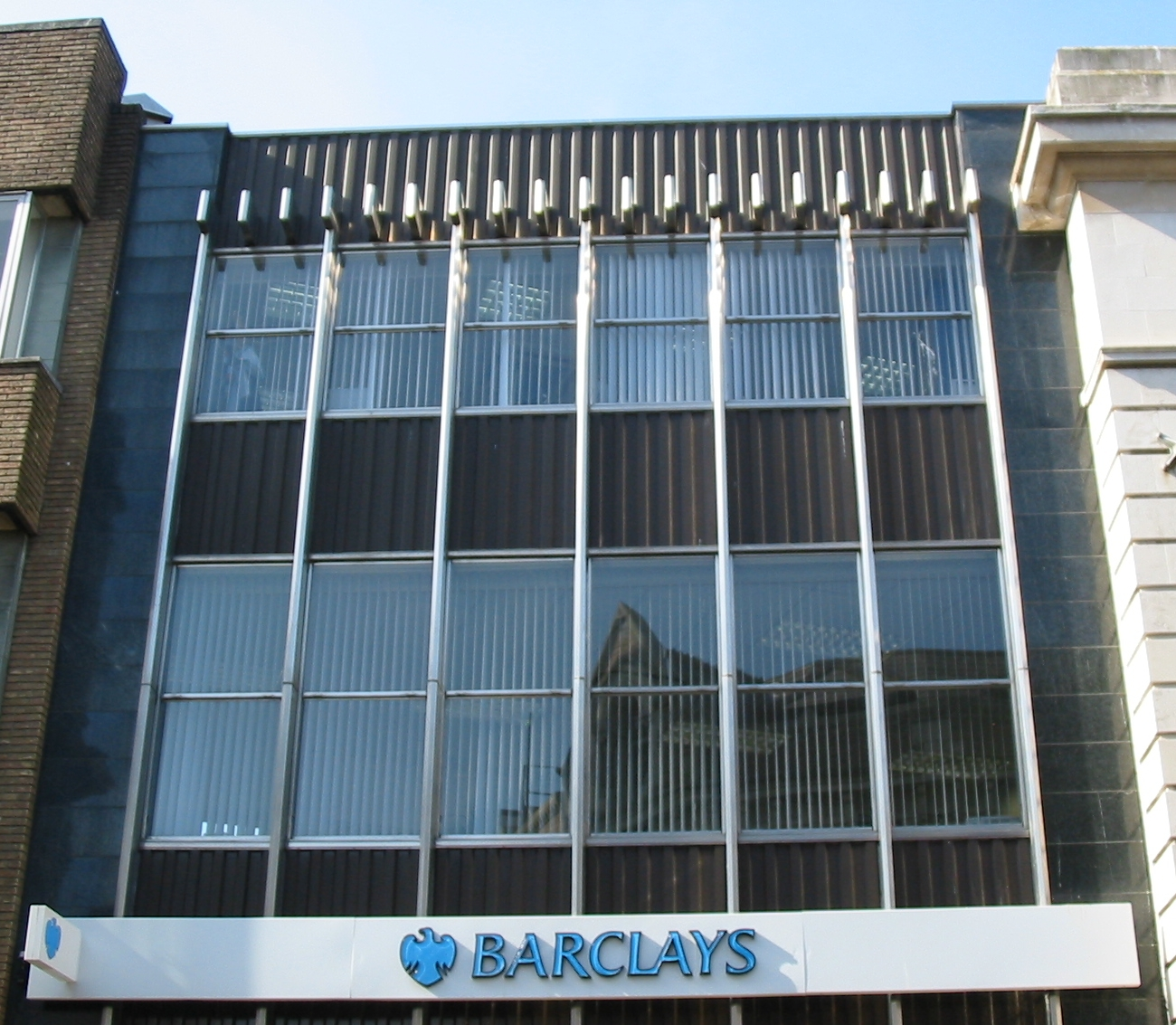
Barclays Bank plc, Jersey Branch

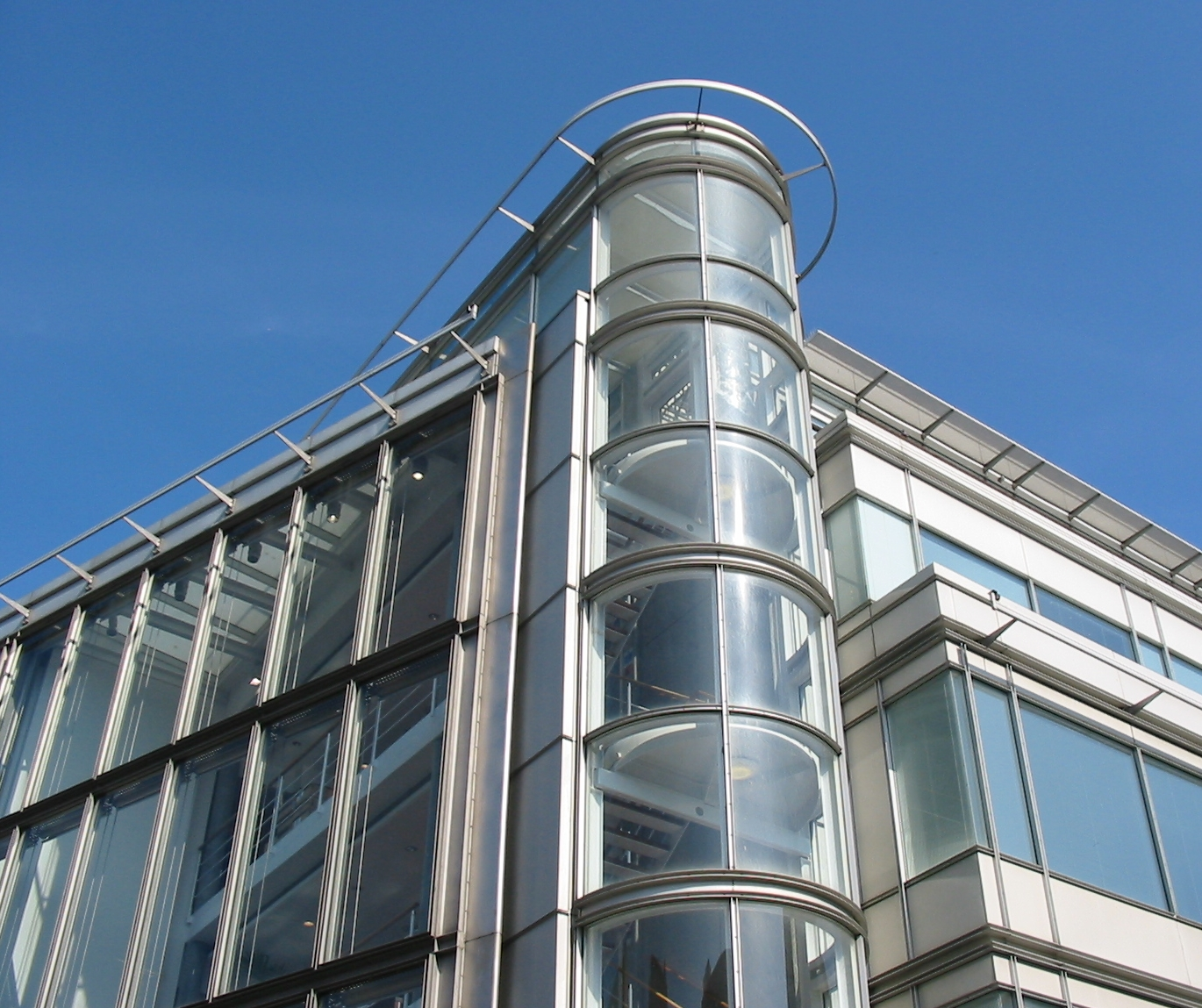
BNP Paribas, Jersey

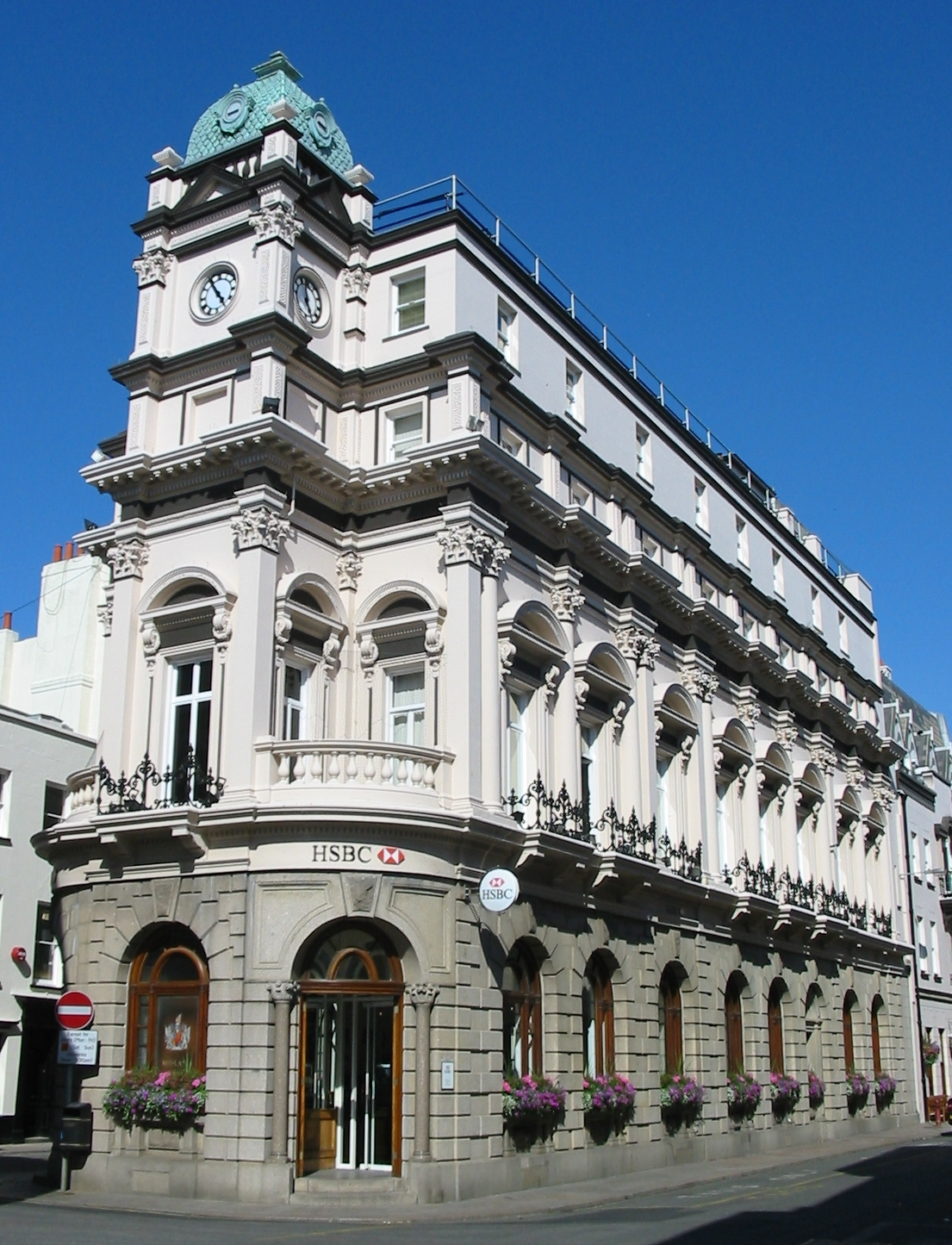
HSBC, Jersey

List of banks registered in the British offshore financial centre of Jersey.

== List ==
- Barclays Bank plc, Jersey Branch
- BNP Paribas S.A. Jersey Branch
- BNP Paribas Securities Services Custody Bank
- Butterfield Bank (Jersey) Limited
- Citibank N.A., Jersey Branch
- Citicorp Banking Corporation
- The Co-operative Bank
- Deutsche Bank International
- EFG Private Bank (Channel Islands) Limited, Jersey Branch
- HSBC Bank Plc, Jersey Branch
- Investec Bank (Channel Islands) Limited, Jersey Branch
- JPMorgan Chase Bank N.A., Jersey Branch
- Kleinwort Benson (Channel Islands)
- Lloyds Bank Jersey Branch
- Lloyds Bank International
- Royal Bank of Canada (Channel Islands) Limited, Jersey Branch
- The Royal Bank of Scotland International Limited (includes Natwest)
- Nedbank Private Wealth Limited, Jersey Branch
- Standard Bank Jersey
- Standard Chartered Bank, Jersey Branch
- Santander
- UBS AG, Jersey Branch
- Union Bancaire Privée, Jersey Branch
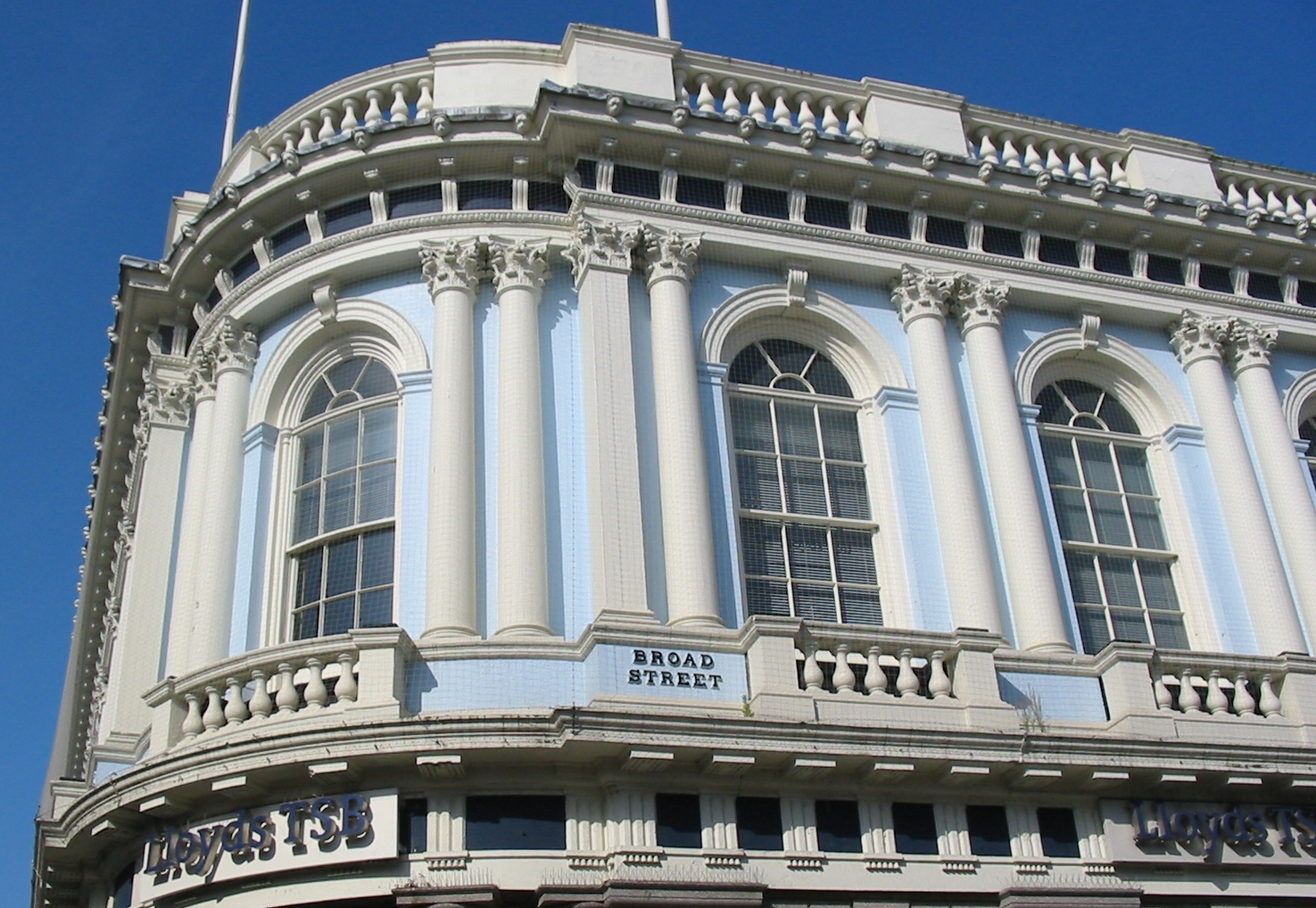
Lloyds TSB, Jersey

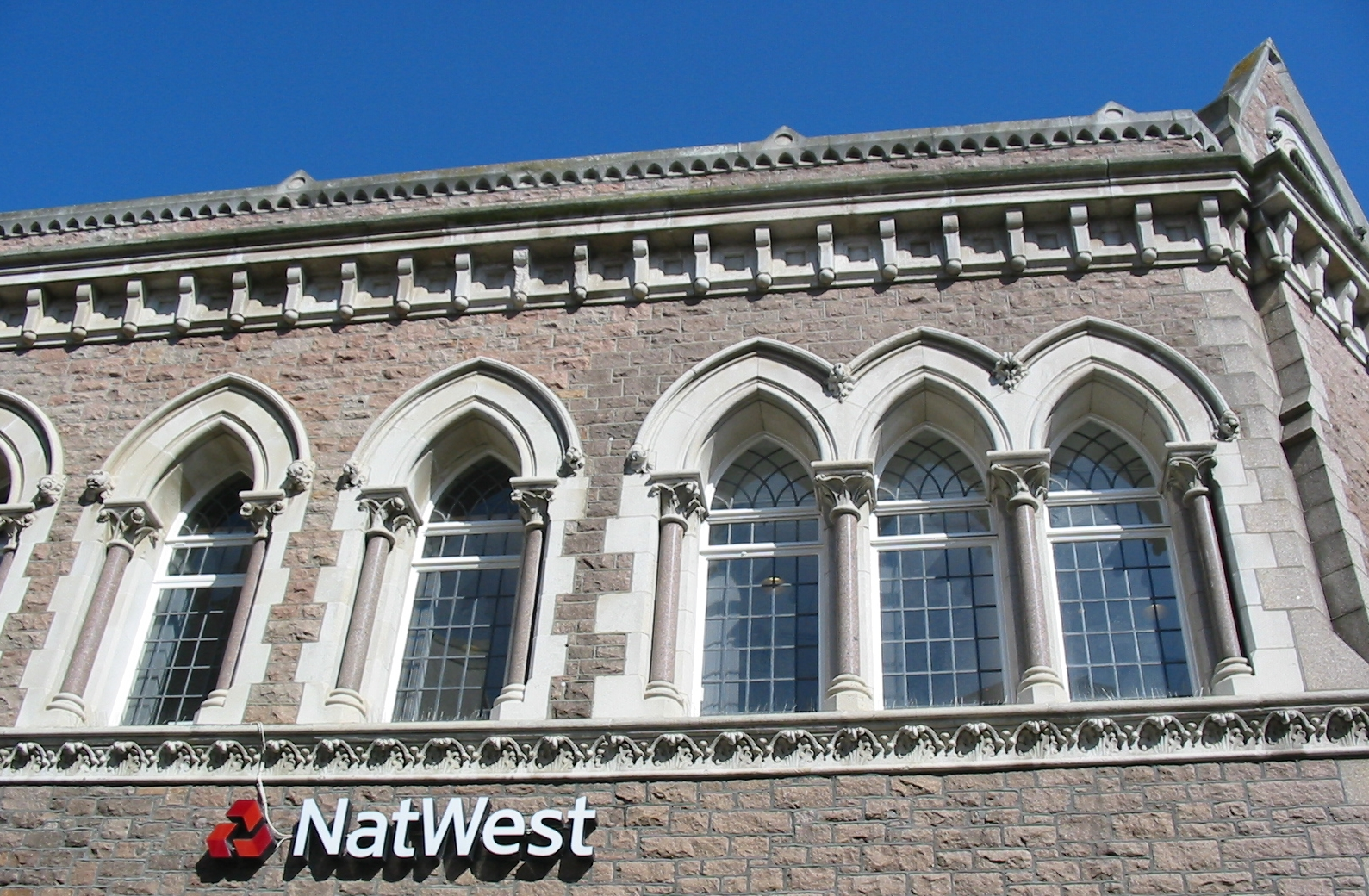
NatWest, Jersey

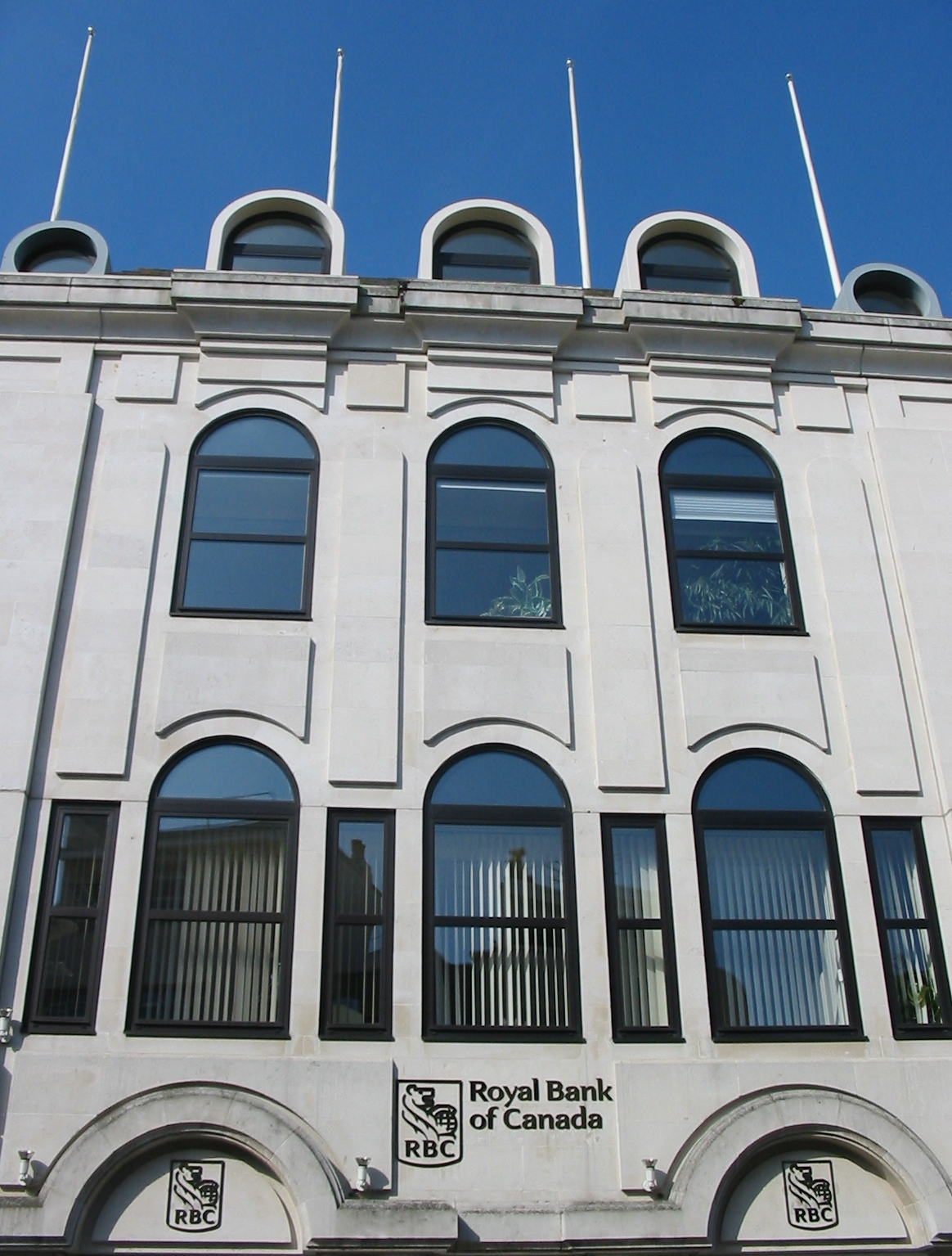
Royal Bank of Canada (Channel Islands) Limited, Jersey Branch

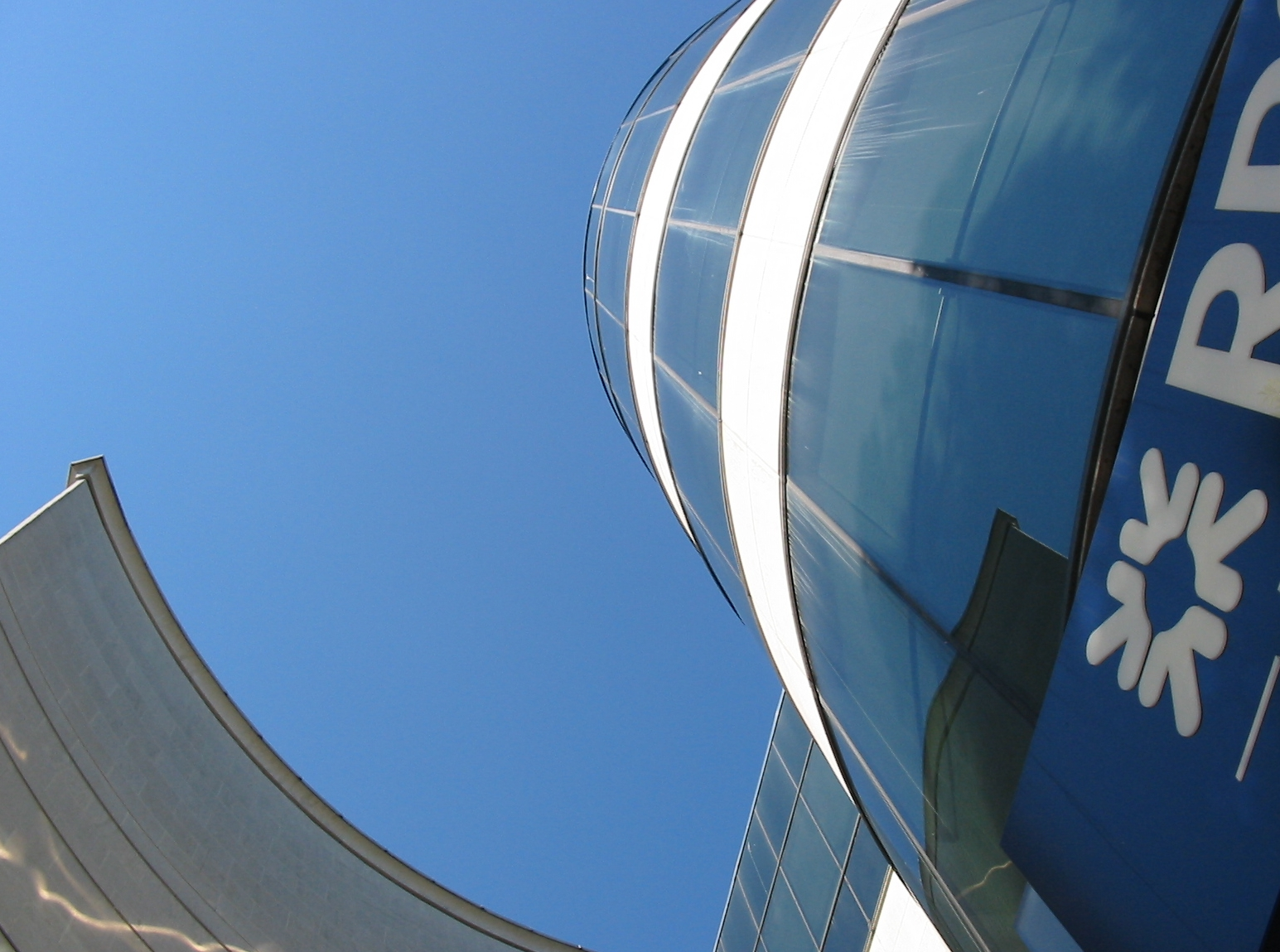
RBS International, Jersey

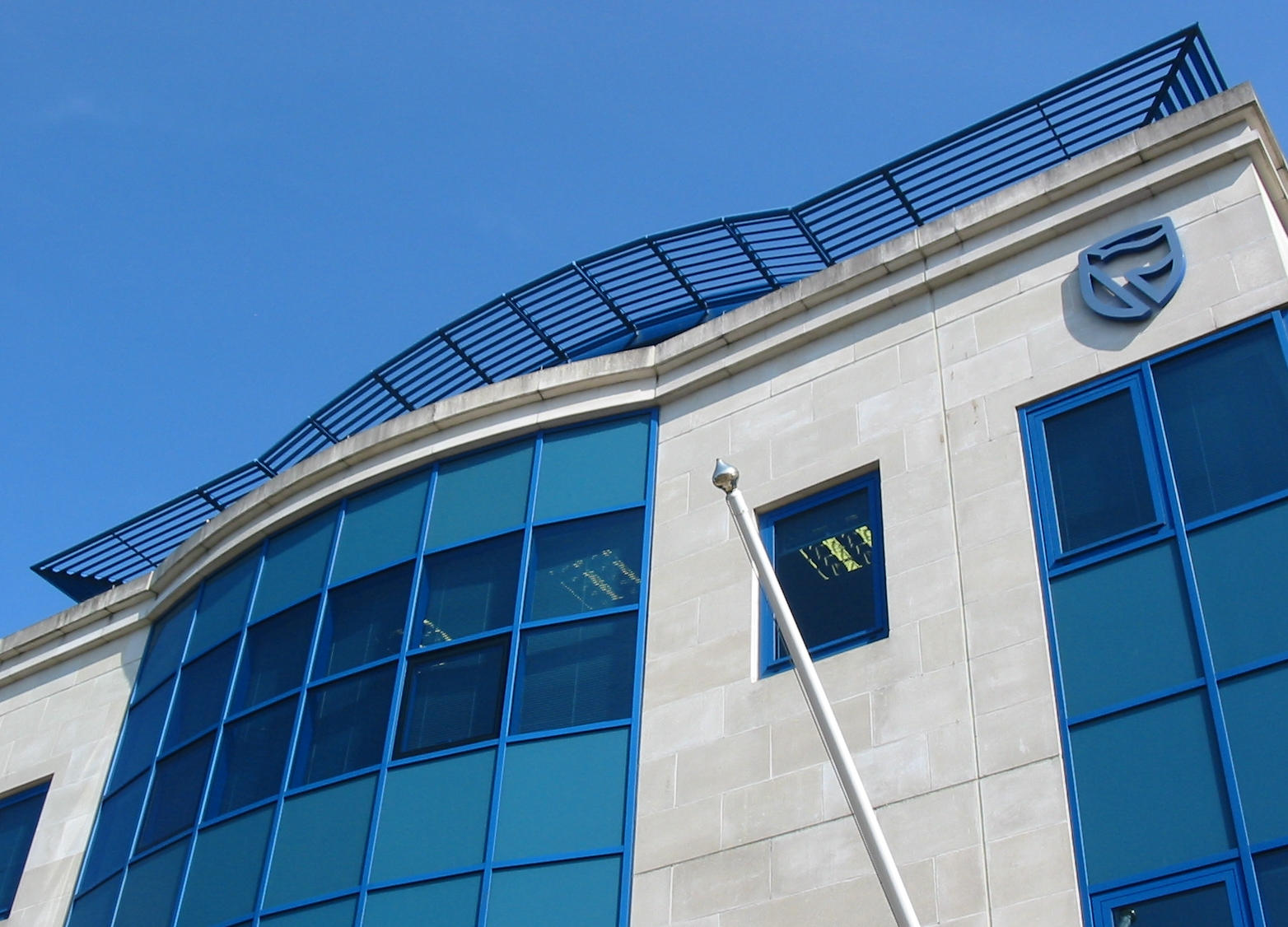
Standard Bank, Jersey

== See also ==
- List of banks in Europe
