= Paris Kassidokostas-Latsis =

Greek shipping heir, socialite, film producer, and ship owner

Paris Kassidokostas-Latsis (Greek: Πάρης Κασιδόκωστας-Λάτσης; born 1982) is a Greek shipping heir, socialite, film and music producer, and ship owner. He is the grandson of the shipping multi-billionaire tycoon Yiannis "John S." Latsis.

== Family ==
Latsis is the son of Marianna Latsis and Grigoris Kassidokostas, who was mayor of the affluent seaside town Vouliagmeni from 1986 to 2012, where he also ran a large water-ski school and was also a former polo player for Panathinaikos.

When his grandfather died in 2003, his fortune was estimated as the 101st largest in the world. Eventually the Latsis family expanded into banking, oil refining and real estate. As of March 2019 Forbes magazine estimated the Latsis family fortune at US$2.7 billion, placing them at No. 838 on the magazine's list of the world's richest people.

== Career ==
=== Film production ===
In 2005, he and Terry Dougas established the film production company 1821 Media which got its name from the Greek Revolution of 1821. Among the stars that have worked with the label are Natalie Portman, Stan Lee, Kevin Costner, Cameron Diaz, and Danny Trejo. Other labels that are in collaboration with 1821 Media are 20th Century Fox, Walt Disney Pictures and Warner Bros.

In 2015, he founded the film financing company Hercules Film Fund, which financed the film American Made starring Tom Cruise. Latsis was executive producer on that film.

=== Music production ===
In 2011, he co-founded with George Arsenakos the record label Panik Records.

=== Shipping ===
In 2012, Paris Kassidokostas-Latsis took over Latsco Shipping Ltd. In addition, he established Marla Bulkers and Marla Tankers in 2017 and 2018 to invest in second hand bulk carriers and second hand tanker respectively. The total fleet of Latsco and Marla is currently 35 vessels.

== Personal life ==
In May 2005, it was announced that Kassidokostas-Latsis was engaged to American socialite Paris Hilton. In September 2005, the couple broke off their engagement. Since early 2015, Kassidokostas-Latsis has been in a relationship with the Greek-Georgian singer Tamta.
