= Jean Pierre Cuoni =

Founder of EFG International

Jean-Pierre Cuoni
- Born: 1937; Lucerne, Switzerland
- Died: 2017 (aged 79–80)
- Education: International Institute for Management Development
- Occupation: Banker
- Known for: Founder and former chairman of EFG International

Jean-Pierre Cuoni (1937–2017) was a Swiss banker known as the co-founder and chairman of EFG International, a Swiss Private Bank.

== Early life and education ==
Cuoni was born in 1937 in Lucerne, Switzerland. He graduated from International Institute for Management Development, Lausanne in 1957.

== Career ==
Cuoni spent 28 years at Citibank, where he headed private banking for Europe, the Middle East, and Africa. He has served as the senior vice President at Citibank. He then served as the CEO of Coutts from 1990 to 1994. In 1995, he co-founded EFG International with Lawrence D. Howell. He also served as the chairman of EFG International from 1997 until 2015.
