= Alexander (yacht) =

1966 yacht

History
- Name: Alexander
- Builder: Lubecker Flender
- Launched: 14 December 1965
- Completed: 5 June 1966
- Identification: Call sign: 9HCH8; IMO number: 6603012
- Status: In service

General characteristics
- Type: Motor yacht
- Tonnage: 5,933 GT
- Length: 121.83 m (399 ft 8 in)
- Beam: 16.9 m (55 ft 5 in)
- Draft: 5.8 m (19 ft 0 in)
- Propulsion: 2 × MAN diesel engines; 2 × 4,025 hp (3,001 kW)
- Speed: 18.5 knots (34.3 km/h; 21.3 mph) (maximum)
- Capacity: 80 passengers in 26 cabins
- Crew: 60 crew members

Alexander is a yacht which was built in 1965 in Lubecker Flender shipyard. It was later refurbished in Germany for use as yacht charter. The yacht was owned by the Latsis family until 2015. It is now owned by the royal family of Saudi Arabia.

== Design ==
The vessel is of steel construction with teak decks. The yacht's overall length is 121.83 meters (399 ft 8 in), (Note: Superyachts.com has the overall length at 122 m (400 ft 3 in).) and her length at waterline is 104.6 m (343 ft 2 in). Her beam is 16.9 m (55 ft 5 in) and a draft of 5.8 m (19 ft 0 in). The yacht is measured at 5,933 gross tonnage (GT). Alexander is powered by two MAN diesel engines each creating 4,025 horsepower (3,001 kW). The vessel can reach a maximum speed of 18 knots (33 km/h; 21 mph) and has a cruising speed of 15–16 knots (28–30 km/h; 17–18 mph) and a maximum range of 4,722 nautical miles (8,745 km; 5,434 mi). The vessel has a crew of 60.

=== Accommodation ===
Alexander accommodates her guests in 39 staterooms, 18 of which are double rooms, 7 twin, and one master. The yacht also has a suite for the yacht-owner, which consists of a living room, a bedroom, and a spacious bathroom. The yacht has a meeting hall, a conference hall, a private cinema, a large living room, and a small restaurant. There are two outside bars and two jacuzzis. The yacht has a helicopter pad.

== See also ==
- List of motor yachts by length
