= Marianna Latsis =

Greek businesswoman

Marianna Latsis (Greek: Μαριάννα Ι. Λάτση; born 29 March 1953) is a Greek businesswoman.

== Early life and family ==
Marianna Latsis is the daughter of Greek businessman Yiannis Latsis. She has two siblings, Spiros and Margarita. She was married to Grigoris Kassidokostas and later to Nikos Kourkoulos, and she has three children including Paris Kassidokostas-Latsis.

== Career ==
In 2019, Latsis and her siblings formally divided the family’s holdings, with Marianna taking the helm of the family’s shipping interests under Latsco, while the others retained interests in banking and real estate. In 2020, she withdrew from Lamda Development and subsequently from the Hellinikon Metropolitan Park investment by selling her stake.

Forbes estimated the Latsis family net worth at $2.2 billion in 2024, with Marianna specifically listed at #1764 globally.

=== Notable stakes ===
Since 8 October 2024, Latsis (via Latsco Direct Investments) owns 10% of Nea Attiki Odos, the operator of the Attiki Odos motorway network since 6 October the same year.

== Social causes ==
Marianna supports causes relating to healthcare, education, and culture. She founded three day care centers for oncology patients named after Nikos Kourkoulo in Athens, in Thessaloniki and in Patras. In 2023, she received the Gold Medal “Evangelis Zappas” from the Olympion and Bequests Committee for philanthropy.

Along with her siblings, Marianna Latsis is a member of the Supervisory Board of the John S. Latsis Public Benefit Foundation.
