= Pontikokastro =

Byzantine castle in Agios Andreas, Kotakolo, Greece

- Ποντικόκαστρο Pontikokastro
- Agios Andreas, Katakolo, Western Greece
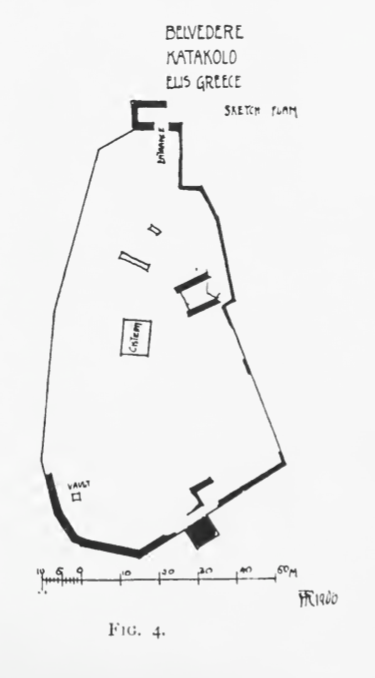
- Outline of the Pontikokastro/Beauvoir castle

Site information
- Type: citadel
- Owner: Greek Ministry of Culture
- Open to the public: yes
- Condition: Partial demolition

Location
- Coordinates: 37.6639°N 21.3139°E

Site history
- Materials: hewn stone (ashlar)

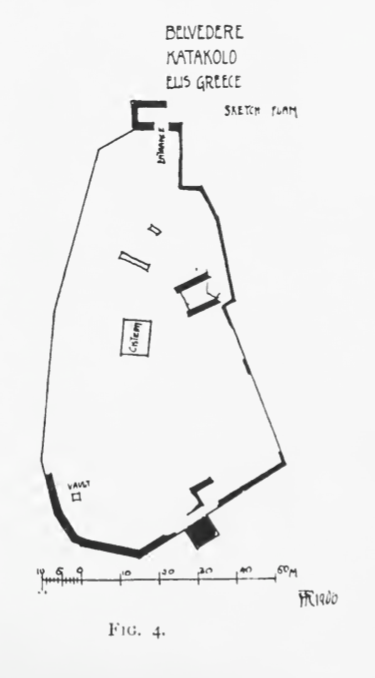
Outline of the Pontikokastro/Beauvoir castle

Pontikokastro (Greek: Ποντικόκαστρο), known in French as Beauvoir and Italian as Belveder during the late Middle Ages, is a Byzantine castle in Agios Andreas, Katakolo, in the Peloponnese peninsula of Greece.

== History ==
The fortress of Pontikon—Pontikokastro, "castle of Pontikon", is a relatively recent name—is one of the oldest Byzantine castles in Greece. It is located in the northern part of Ichthys Bay, 100 meters from the coast, and is built on the ruins of the acropolis of ancient Pheia, dating from 700 BC.

Different views have been expressed about the name, with some claiming that Pontikon derives from the ancient Greek word pontos, "sea", because of its view over the Ionian Sea. Others claim it is due to the similarity of the shape of a mouse (pontikos). The most probable view is considered to be that of the folklorist Dinos Psychogios, that the name came from a corruption of the Latin "fonticum", meaning warehouse, because the castle was used as storage for crop wheat and other products.

After the Fourth Crusade, the castle was conquered by the Frankish Crusaders who established the Principality of Achaea in ca. 1205. They called it Beauvoir in French, Belveder in Italian and Bellovidere or Pulchrumvidere in Latin. It originally formed part of the princely domain of Achaea, and along with the fortress and princely mint of Glarentza it was one of the two major sites from which Elis was governed. Beauvoir was granted in 1289 to Hugh, Count of Brienne, in exchange for his half of the Barony of Karytaina, but Hugh soon exchanged it with John Chauderon for lands in Conversano. By 1303, however, it had returned to direct princely control. During Ferdinand of Majorca's attempt to seize the Principality in 1315–16, Beauvoir was captured and held by his forces until after his defeat and death in the Battle of Manolada. Beauvoir ceased to play an important role thereafter, and is scarcely mentioned in the subsequent periods of Ottoman and Venetian rule. In 1391 it was taken over by the Navarrese Company, in 1427 by Constantine Palaiologos, and after that by Thomas Palaiologos. It was burned down by the Turks in 1470.

The castle walls form an elongated rectangle, mostly of Byzantine construction with traces of Frankish interventions. It encloses an area of about one acre (0.40 ha), 90 m (300 ft) in length and 55 m (180 ft) wide. At the northwest corner there is a tower 12 m (39 ft) high and 8 m (26 ft) wide, with seventeen courses of circular and seven courses of rectangular masonry. The first two of the courses clearly date back to ancient Greek times. In the middle of the castle there is an oblong calculated cistern, measuring five metres (16 ft) from north to south, divided into two unequal parts by a partition wall, and four pairs of square holes from which the water came out sideways.

== Sources ==
- Bon, Antoine (1969). La Morée franque. Recherches historiques, topographiques et archéologiques sur la principauté d'Achaïe [The Frankish Morea. Historical, Topographic and Archaeological Studies on the Principality of Achaea] (in French). Paris: De Boccard.
