= Pheia (Elis) =

Human settlement in Greece

- Φειά; Φειαί
- Location within Greece
- 37°39′51.4″N 21°18′50.5″E
- Location: Elis, Greece

Site notes
- Website: pheia.gr

Pheia (Ancient Greek: αἱ Φειαί or Φειά) or Phea (Φεά) was a city of ancient Elis in the Pisatis, situated upon the isthmus connecting the promontory Ichthys (now the Cape of Katakolo) with the mainland. Pheia is mentioned by Homer, who places it near the Iardanus, which is apparently the mountain torrent north of Ichthys, and which flows into the sea on the northern side of the lofty mountain Skaphídi.

It was built in a natural bay at today's Agios Andreas, Katakolo. It was destroyed in the 6th century. Upon a very conspicuous peaked height upon the isthmus of Ichthys are the ruins of a castle of the Middle Ages, called Pontikokastro, built upon the remains of the Hellenic walls of Pheia. On either side of Ichthys are two harbours; the northern one, which is a small creek, was the port of Pheia; the southern one is the broad bay of Katakolo, which is now much frequented, but was too open and exposed for ancient navigation. The position of these harbours explains the narrative of Thucydides, who relates that in the first year of the Peloponnesian War (431 BCE), the Athenian fleet, having sailed from Methone in Messenia, landed at Pheia (that is, in the bay of Katakolo), and laid waste the country; but a storm having arisen, they sailed round the promontory Ichthys into the harbour of Pheia. Thereafter the Athenians used the town and ports as a base for military operations in Elis. In front of the harbour was a small island, which Polybius calls Pheias.

== Archaeological remains ==
The first excavations were made in 1911. In 1959 Nikos Yalouris explored the underwater remains of Pheia. In 1973 the Hellenic Institute of Marine Archaeology made a survey in the bay of Agios Andreas near Katakolo, and found the remains of the town at a depth of 5 metres (16 ft) below sea level. The archaeological remains at Agios Andreas date from the Early Helladic through the Byzantine periods. The finds included the remains of buildings, pot sherds, fragments of amphorae, the remains of a Roman cemetery and a Byzantine coin. Two cycladic marble figures from the Bronze Age were found on the headland, as well as finds of tombs and remains of Roman buildings on Tigani island. A kouros and the remains of a painted terracotta roof are among the finds dating to the late Archaic period. There is also prehistoric pottery scattered across the site.

== Destruction ==
Recent studies at Agios Andreas have shown that the region suffered from the effects of tsunamis several times. Pheia was destroyed in 551 by a tsunami caused by an earthquake that was known historically. The earthquake was also responsible for the destruction of the city of Patras and for completing the destruction of the Temple of Zeus at Olympia.
