= EFG Bank European Financial Group =

Bank based in Geneva, Switzerland

EFG Bank European Financial Group Logo

EFG Bank European Financial Group SA is a bank and financial holding company based in Geneva, Switzerland. It is the controlling shareholder of EFG International, a Swiss private banking and asset management group listed on the SIX Swiss Exchange.

The Latsis family holds a controlling stake in EFG International through the group’s holding structure.

EFG International operates as a Swiss private banking group and has pursued acquisitions as part of its strategy in a consolidating Swiss wealth-management market.

== Potential mergers ==
In 2024, takeover discussions involving Swiss private bank Julius Baer and EFG International were reported. The merger stalled amid regulatory concerns.

== See also ==
- EFG International
