= EFG International =

Private banking group

EFG International AG
- Traded as: SIX: EFGN
- Industry: Financial services
- Founded: 1995
- Headquarters: Zürich, Switzerland
- Area served: Europe, Asia Pacific, the Americas, Middle East
- Key people: Alexander Classen (Chairman); Giorgio Pradelli (CEO)
- Products: Private banking
- Operating income: CHF 1,669.0 million (2025)
- Net income: CHF 325.2 million (2025)
- AUM: CHF 185.0 billion (2025)
- Total assets: CHF 39.4 billion (2025)
- Total equity: CHF 1.8 billion (2025)
- Owner: EFG Bank European Financial Group (45.8%)
- Number of employees: 3,225 (2026)
- Parent: EFG Bank European Financial Group
- Website: www.efginternational.com

EFG International is a global private banking group offering private banking and asset management services, headquartered in Zurich. EFG International's group of private banking businesses operates in more than 40 locations worldwide, with around 3,225 employees (as of 31 December 2025).

== History ==
EFG (European Financial Group) International was formed in 1995 by Jean Pierre Cuoni, Lawrence D. Howell, Baron Corso von Habsburg, and several others. The genesis of the bank was by the acquisitions of both the right to operate from the Zurich office of Banque de Deposits and the Swiss operations of the Royal Bank of Scotland.

In 2016, EFG International bought BSI from BTG Pactual for CHF 1.33 billion ($1.33 billion). Less than a year earlier, BTG Pactual had bought the Swiss bank from the Italian Generali for CHF 1.25 billion.

In 2024 and 2025, the bank continued to expand, surpassing its recruitment plan. At the end of 2025 EFG’s total number of CROs (Customer Relationship Officers) was 763, compared to 703 at end-2024. Total profit in 2025 rose to CHF 325.2 million.

== Structure ==
EFG International's largest shareholder is EFG Bank European Financial Group, a Swiss bank based in Geneva, holding about 45.8% of its capital. This is in turn a distinct and separate sub-group of European Financial Group EFG (Luxembourg) (“EFG Group”), based in Luxembourg. In addition, BTGP-BSI Limited and Banco BTG Pactual SA, holds 13.3% of EFG International.

EFG Bank is EFG International’s main Swiss private banking subsidiary. EFG Bank is headquartered in Zurich, and has branches and representative offices in over 40 locations across Europe, Asia Pacific, the Americas and Middle East. EFG International has a number of other private banking subsidiaries including EFG Private Bank Limited in the UK and EFG Capital in the US.

== Executive Committee ==
- Giorgio Pradelli – Chief Executive Officer
- Ioanna Archimandriti – Chief People Officer
- Vassiliki Dimitrakopoulou – Global Head of Legal & Compliance
- Demis Stucki – Chief Operating Officer
- Dimitris Politis – Chief Financial Officer & Deputy CEO
- Enrico Piotto – Chief Risk Officer
- Andre Portelli – Head of Investment & Client Solutions
