= Elis =

Regional unit of Western Greece

Elis Περιφερειακή ενότητα Ηλείας
- Regional unit
- Municipalities of Elis

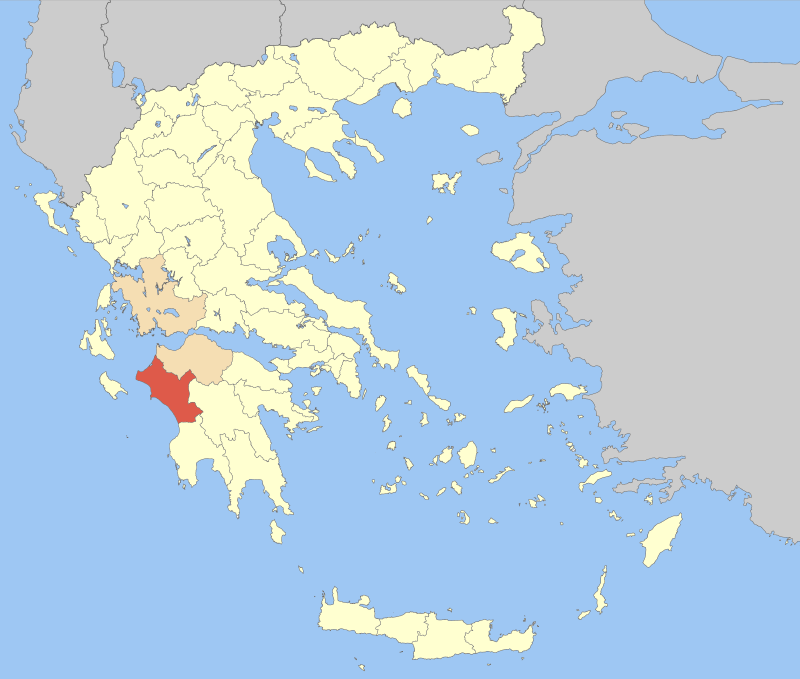
- Elis within Greece

- Location within Greece
- Coordinates: 37°40′N 21°30′E
- Country: Greece
- Administrative region: Western Greece
- Seat: Pyrgos

Area
  - Total: 2,618 km^{2} (1,011 sq mi)

Population (2021)
  - Total: 149,896
  - Density: 57.26/km^{2} (148.3/sq mi)
- Time zone: UTC+2 (EET)
  - Summer (DST): UTC+3 (EEST)
- Postal code: 27x xx
- Area code: 262x0
- Vehicle registration: ΗΑ
- Website: www.pde.gov.gr/gr/

Elis, also known as Ellis or Ilia (Greek: Ηλεία, Eleia), is a historic region in the western part of the Peloponnese peninsula of Greece. It is administered as a regional unit of the modern region of Western Greece. Its capital is Pyrgos. Until 2011, it was Elis Prefecture, covering the same territory.

The modern regional unit is nearly coterminous with the ancient Elis of the classical period. Here lie the ancient ruins of the cities of Elis, Epitalion and Olympia, known for the ancient Olympic Games that started in 776 BC.

== Geography ==
The northernmost point of Elis is 38° 06'N, the westernmost is 22° 12′E, the southernmost is 37° 18′N, and the easternmost is 21° 54′E. The length from north to south is 100 km (62 mi), and from east-to-west is around 55 km (34 mi).

The modern regional unit is not completely congruent with ancient Elis: Lampeia belonged to ancient Arcadia, and Kalogria is now part of Achaea.

The longest river is the Alfeios. Other rivers are the Erymanthos, Pineios and Neda. The Alfeios, Pineios and Neda flow into the Ionian Sea in Elis. Less than 1% of the prefecture is open water, most of it found in artificial reservoirs and dams, in the north and east. The Pineios Dam supplies water for Northern Elis. The water is not safe for drinking, because it contains some contaminants. A second, smaller reservoir in the river Alfeios near Olympia and Krestena supplies water to Pyrgos.

The eastern part of the regional unit is forested, with mostly pine trees in the south. There are forest preserves in Foloi and the mountain ranges of Eastern Elis. In the north is the Strofylia forest which has pine trees. Mountain ranges include Movri (around 720 m or 2,400 ft), Divri (around 1500 m), Minthe (around 1100 m), and more.

About one-third of the land is fertile; the rest is mountainous and not suitable for crops. Swamplands used to cover 1–1.5% of the region, especially in the Samiko area. Most of them have been drained for agricultural purposes; only 10 km^{2} (4 sq miles) has been kept and is now protected.

Here lie the ancient ruins of Elis, Epitalion and Olympia, known for the ancient Olympic Games which started in 776 BC. There is a museum with statues that relate to the history of Olympia. Another museum is in Elis, but it is very small. Monasteries are scattered around the region.

=== Climate ===
Elis has a Mediterranean climate, with hot, sunny summers. Temperatures over 40 °C have been recorded. The mountainous interior is colder, and snow covers the mountains in winter. Elis is more humid than the eastern Peloponnese.

=== Natural disasters ===
Elis is located in a seismically active zone, and there are several earthquakes each year. Some of the most significant earthquakes to have hit the area are:

- 1909: earthquake in Chavari
- 1910: earthquake in Vartholomio
- 1920: earthquake in Kyllini
- 1953: Ionian earthquake, minor damage in Elis
- 2008: 8 June Peloponnese earthquake, 2 deaths; hundreds of damaged homes and buildings were reported in Lechaina, Amaliada and Vartholomio

Rainy weather in 2002–2003 caused destruction of villages by mudslides, and some bridges and roads were also cut off. In February 2008, frost devastated many crops in Manolada, Nea Manolada and Kounoupeli.

In August 2007, there were enormous forest fires which led to tens of deaths and a massive environmental and economic disaster. The final toll for the prefecture was: 45 dead, 100,000 affected by the fire, 3,500 left homeless by the fire, 25,000 dead animals, 8,500 hectares of burnt forests, 2,300 hectares of burnt farmland. The archaeological site of Olympia was seriously threatened, but not damaged.

== Administration ==
The regional unit Elis is subdivided into 7 municipalities. These are (number as in the map in the infobox):

- Ancient Olympia (4)
- Andravida-Kyllini (6)
- Andritsaina-Krestena (3)
- Ilida (2)
- Pineios (7)
- Pyrgos (1)
- Zacharo (5)

=== 2011 reform ===
As a part of the 2011 Kallikratis government reform, the regional unit Elis was created out of the former prefecture Elis (Greek: Νομός Ηλείας). The prefecture had the same territory as the present regional unit. At the same time, the municipalities were reorganised, according to the table below.

New municipality	Old municipalities	Seat
Ancient Olympia (Archaia Olympia)	Archaia Olympia	Archaia Olympia
Ancient Olympia (Archaia Olympia)	Lampeia	Archaia Olympia
Ancient Olympia (Archaia Olympia)	Lasiona	Archaia Olympia
Ancient Olympia (Archaia Olympia)	Foloi	Archaia Olympia
Andravida-Kyllini	Andravida	Lechaina
Andravida-Kyllini	Vouprasia	Lechaina
Andravida-Kyllini	Kastro-Kyllini	Lechaina
Andravida-Kyllini	Lechaina	Lechaina
Andritsaina-Krestena	Andritsaina	Krestena
Andritsaina-Krestena	Alifeira	Krestena
Andritsaina-Krestena	Skillounta	Krestena
Ilida	Amaliada	Amaliada
Ilida	Pineia	Amaliada
Pineios	Gastouni	Gastouni
Pineios	Kavasila	Gastouni
Pineios	Vartholomio	Gastouni
Pineios	Tragano	Gastouni
Pyrgos	Pyrgos	Pyrgos
Pyrgos	Volakas	Pyrgos
Pyrgos	Iardanos	Pyrgos
Pyrgos	Oleni	Pyrgos
Zacharo	Zacharo	Zacharo
Zacharo	Figaleia	Zacharo

=== Provinces ===
Before 2006, Elis was divided into two provinces: Elis Province and Olympia Province. Elis Province contained Hollow or Lowland Elis and the northern part of Pisatis. It was the smallest, but most populous of the two provinces. The seat was Pyrgos. Olympia Province contained most of Pisatis and Triphylia. Its seat was Andritsaina, in the mountains; Krestena and Zacharo were the largest towns in the province.

== Population ==
Elis is the second most populous regional unit of the Peloponnese, after Achaea. Between 70% and 75% of the population live on fertile lands away from the mountains.

Historical population
Year	Pop.	±%
1940	186,945	—
1961	188,861	+1.0%
1981	217,371	+15.1%
1991	174,287	−19.8%
2001	183,521	+5.3%
2011	159,300	−13.2%
2021	149,896	−5.9%

The population of ancient Elis (from 1000 to 1001 BC) was in the range of 5,000 to 10,000 and reached 10,000 or 20,000 by 1 BC. The population reached 217,000 around 1981, but has been declining since. Pyrgos became the largest city having the population over the 10,000 mark in the mid-20th century, and above 20,000 in the late 1980s. The population in the northwest is growing while the population is declining in the southeast and east.

== Economy ==
=== Agriculture ===
The primary source of agriculture is maize, tomatoes, potatoes, green peppers, livestock, watermelon, melon and some vegetables. There are 3 major operating tomato factories in Savalia (Kyknos), Gastouni (Pelargos), and north of Andravida (Asteris). The most fertile land in Peloponnese is the plain that covers the northern part of Elis and the adjacent part of Achaea.

Textiles used to be dominant in business from antiquity until the Middle Ages. In the 1950s, agriculture was the dominant occupation, except in the towns Amaliada and Pyrgos. Currently, one third of jobs in Elis is in the agricultural sector.

=== Fishing ===
Squid, and all types of fish are common in the waters of Elis. Fishing is mainly done in the southeastern Ionian Sea and in the Bay of Patras. Most of the production is sent into Patras, some into Athens, some elsewhere in the world (with small production) and some into the local markets of Elis from Kyllini and Katakolo. Overfishing is a problem north of Lechaina.

== History ==
In classical antiquity, Elis was a great independent city-state centred on the city of Elis. It included the sanctuary at Olympia, where the Ancient Olympic Games were held between 776 BC and 394 AD and which Elis administered. After 146 BC, Elis was part of the province Achaea within the Roman Empire.

In the Migration Period (3rd - 4th century AD) Vandals and Visigoths rampaged through the region. After the final partition of the Roman Empire in 395, Elis was ruled by the Byzantine Empire.

In the aftermath of the Fourth Crusade, crusaders from Western Europe (traditionally referred to as Franks in southeastern Europe) established the principality of Achaea in the territory of the defeated Byzantine Empire. The region of Elis was the Principality's heartland, containing its capital, Andravida, the port town and mint of Glarentza, the fortress of Chlemoutsi, and the extensive Barony of Akova. The Principality lasted from 1204 until 1432, when it was conquered by the Byzantine Despotate of the Morea, which in turn fell in 1460 to the Ottoman Empire.

The Ottoman Empire ruled most of Greece until the Greek War of Independence of 1821. The Venetian Republic controlled a few coastal towns in the 1490s, early 16th century and from 1686 until 1715. Battlegrounds of the Greek War of Independence in Elis include Chlemoutsi, Gastouni, Lala, Lampeia, Pyrgos and Andritsaina.

As a part of independent Greece, Elis experienced an economic and agricultural upswing in the first decades after the war of independence. Houses were built, and Pyrgos became a regional centre. Like most of the Peloponnese, the area was unaffected during World War I. World War II struck parts of Elis, houses were damaged, leaving people homeless, and afterwards the Greek Civil War caused more destruction and economic decline. The return to democracy after the Greek military junta of 1967–1974, and Greece joining the European Communities in 1981 stimulated economic development and improvement of infrastructure.

== Transport ==
=== Roads ===
The main roads of Elis are: the A5 motorway from Ioannina and Patras, which opened in 2025; the EO9 from Patras and Methoni; and the EO74 from Tripoli. The EO33 and EO76 also pass through the north eastern and south eastern corner of Elis respectively, while the EO78 is an airport road to Andravida Air Base.

European route E55 passes through the regional unit, following the A5 from Patras to Pyrgos, and then the EO9 to Kalo Nero. There are also 50 numbered provincial roads.

=== Railways ===
The total length of railway tracks in Elis is around 140 km. There is a railway line from Patras to Kalamata via Pyrgos, and a branch line from Pyrgos to Olympia. Since January 2011, traffic is suspended on the line from Patras to Kalamata, and only the branch line from Pyrgos to Olympia has regular passenger trains.

=== Ports ===
The port of Kyllini in the northwest is the busiest port in Elis, with car ferries to the islands of Zakynthos and Kefalonia. The port of Katakolo is an important stop for cruise ships, offering an opportunity for passengers to visit the site of Ancient Olympia. Other ports or harbors are small in size and fit only smaller boats.

=== Airports ===
Elis has a military airport near Andravida, north of Pyrgos. There are no public airports in the area. The nearest airport on land is in Kalamata.

== Communications ==
Telephones became more common after the 1960s when the Hellenic Telecommunication Organization (ΟΤΕ) created hundreds of kilometres of phone lines in the region. Now nearly every household has a telephone. The ΟΤΕ built tens of towers to connect more lines for the internet, telephones, and cell phones to increase the service. Lines began around the mid-20th century to enable more people to communicate by phones in the whole of Greece. There are also several communication towers throughout the prefecture.

- ORT (Olympiaki Radiofonia Tileorasi) serves the whole of Elis. ORT is a Polis affiliate.

There are several local radio stations, for instance RSA (Radio Station of Amalias) from Amalias and Eleftheri Radiofonas Krestenas from Krestena. There are hundreds of transmitter towers scattered over Elis.

== Persons ==
- Panagiotis Adraktas (b. September 28, 1948 in Kardamas), a New Democracy politician
- Hristodoulos Aholos or Acholos
- Panagiotis Anagnostopoulos, revolutionary leader
- Astydameia
- Atreus
- Dionysia-Theodora Avgerinopoulou among the youngest politicians of the Greek Parliament and UN Award recipient
- Avgerinos family:
  - Agamemnon Avgerinos
  - Andreas Avgerinos
  - Charalambos Avgerinos
  - Dimitrios Avgerinos
  - Nakis Avgerinos
  - Petros Avgerinos
- Dionyssios N. Bokos, writer of Myrsini, Nihta Pepromenou, etc.
- Andreas Bratis, writer of To Vartholomo (The Vartholonio)
- Christopoulos family:
  - Agamemnon Christopoulos, politician, brother of Asimakis
  - Anastasios Christopoulos, revolutionary leader
  - Asimakis Christopoulos, politicians, brother of Tzannetos
  - Charalampos Christopoulos, politician
  - Christos Christopoulos, father of Anastasios
  - Tzannetos Christopoulos, politician, son of Anastasios
- Christos Daralexis, journalist
- Themistoklis Daralexis, politician
- Vyronas Davos, a writer, historian and a poet, he published works on Ilia during the Frankish, Ottoman, Venetian periods, the Greek War of Independence and the Modern period
- Ioannis Diakos, revolutionary leader
- Takis Doxas, writer
- Epeus, ancient mythological legend
- Ioannis Giannopoulos, politician
- Kostis Gontikas (b. 1934), politician
- Dimitrios Gontikas (1888–1967), politician and former president of the Greek parliament
- Aristeidis Griboutis, journalist
- Miltiadis Iatridis, revolutionary leader
- Nikos Kahtitsis, writer
- Antonios Kalogeropoulos, a revolutionary leader from Myrsini (then Souleimanaga)
- Athanassios Kanellopoulos, politician
- Simon Karas, music historian
- Andreas Karkavitsas
- Kostas Kazakos, actor
- Dimitrios Kioussopoulos, former Prime Minister of Greece
- Dionyssos Kokkinos, writer
- Dimitrios Korkolis, politician and mayor of Pyrgos
- Krestenitis family:
  - Aristeidis Krestenitis
  - Georgios Krestenitis, two politicians
  - Ioannis Krestenis (elder)
  - Ioannis Krestenitis (younger), politician
  - Lykourgos Krestenitis (1793–1873), president of the Greek parliament
  - Stamatis Krestenitis, a Greek revolutionary leader
- Christos Laskaris, poet
- Liourdis family:
  - Ioannis Liourdis, politician
  - Spyros Liourdis, Greek revolutionary leader
  - Georgios and Petros Mitzos, revolutionary leaders
- Georgios Nikoloutsopoulos, a revolutionary leader from Myrsini (then Souleimanaga)
- Alexandros Panagoulis
- Georgios Papandreou, an unrelated historian
- Ioannis Pesmazoglou
- Takis Sinopoulos, poet
- Sisinis family:
  - Chrysanthos Sisinis (died 1845), a Greek revolutionary leader and a politician
- Georgios Sisinis, a Greek revolutionary leader
- Christos Stefanopoulos, politician
- Theodoridis family:
  - Thallis Theodoridis (elder), a Greek revolutionary leader
  - Thallis Theodoridis (younger), a politician
  - Vasileios Theodoridis, journalist
- Konstantinos Varouxis, journalist, Patris writer
- Leonidas Varouxis, journalist, Patris writer
- Alexis Vilaetis, a 19th-century politician who was elected in 1868
- Charalambos Vilaetis, a Greek revolutionary leader
- Lysandros Vilaetis, a chief of Pyrgos and a politician
- Nikolaos Vilaetis
- Panagis Vourloumis
- Panagiotis Kondylis, philosopher, writer and editor
- Dimitris Eleas, writer living in London
- Panos Karnezis, writer living in London
- For the kings of Elis (now Ilia), see section
- Pyrrho, father of Skepticism

== Sporting teams ==
- Aias Gastouni - Gastouni
- Asteras Amaliada - Amaliada
- Dafni - Andravida
- Doxa Nea Manolada - Nea Manolada
- Iliakos - Lechaina
- Olympiacos Zacharo - Zacharo
- Paniliakos - Pyrgos
- PAO Varda - Varda
- PAS Pyrgos - Pyrgos

== In popular culture ==
- The central action of Maeve Binchy's romance novel, Nights of Rain and Stars (2004), is set in Agia Anna, Elis.
- Elis is known within the Greek internet community for the strange or tragicomic news stories that are reported from the region, similar to the "Florida Man" meme.

== See also ==
- Elis (constituency)
