= Avgerinos (name) =

Avgerinos is a Greek name, significantly of a family of Elis. Notable people with the name include:

- Agamemnon Avgerinos (fl. 1821–1865), Greek politician
- Andreas Avgerinos (1820–1895), Greek politician
- Avgerinos Katranas (born 1988), Greek footballer
- Charalambos Avgerinos (1866–1942), Greek politician
- Georgios Avgerinos (fl. 1778–1821), Greek leader and merchant
- Nakis Avgerinos (1911–2002), Greek politician
- Paraskevas Avgerinos (born 1927), Greek politician
- Paul Avgerinos (born 1957), American musician
- Petros Avgerinos (fl. 1868–1889), Greek politician
- Theo Avgerinos (born 1978), American film director
