= Leonidas (disambiguation) =

Leonidas was the king of Sparta who ruled c. 489–480 BC, and who led the allied Greek forces in a last stand at the Battle of Thermopylae.

Leonidas may also refer to:

== Arts and media ==
- Leonidas (Legends of Chima), a character in Legends of Chima
- Leonidas (sculpture), a 5th-century BC sculpture
- Leonidas at Thermopylae, a 19th-century oil painting by Jacques-Louis David
- Leonidas, an 1894 secular oratorio by Max Bruch
- Leonidas Witherall, fictional character created by Phoebe Atwood Taylor

== People ==
=== Antiquity ===
- Leonidas I, Greek king of Sparta, ruled c. 489–480 BC
- Leonidas II, Greek king of Sparta, ruled c. 254–235 BC
- Leonidas of Rhodes, ancient Greek Olympic runner
- Leonidas of Tarentum, Greek poet
- Leonidas of Epirus, teacher of Alexander the Great
- Leonidas of Alexandria, Greek poet

=== Saints ===
- Saint Leonidas (disambiguation), any of several people

=== Modern times ===
- Leonidas (given name), including a list of people with the name
- Georgina Leonidas, British actress
- Stephanie Leonidas, British actress
- Nate Ebner (nicknamed Leonidas), American football player in the National Football League
- Ben Roberts-Smith (nicknamed Leonidas), Australian former soldier
- Rafael Leónidas Trujillo, Dominican President

== Places ==
- Leonidas, New Orleans, Louisiana, US
- Leonidas, Minnesota, US
- Leonidas Township, Michigan, US

== Vessels ==
- Leonidas (ship), labour ship that brought the first indentured servants from India to Fiji in 1879
- USS Leonidas, either of two ships in the US Navy
- HMS Leonidas, either of two ships in the Royal Navy

== Other uses ==
- ELBO Leonidas-2, Greek-built armored personnel carrier
- Epirus Leonidas, a high-power microwave (HPM) weapon system
- Leonidas Squadron (Leonidas Staffel), an experimental Luftwaffe unit of suicide pilots that tested crewed versions of the V-1 flying bomb
- Fedora (operating system) version 11 (codename "Leonidas")
- Leonidas (chocolate maker), a chocolate producer
- RKSV Leonidas, a Dutch amateur football club from Rotterdam

== See also ==
- Leonid (disambiguation)
- Leonides (disambiguation)
- Leonida (disambiguation)
