= 1865 Greek parliamentary election =

- 14 May 1865
| Party | Leader | Seats |
|---|---|---|
| Russian Party | Alexandros Koumoundouros | 95 |
| French Party | Dimitrios Voulgaris | 40 |
| Ottonian loyalists | – | 35 |
This lists parties that won seats. See the complete results below.
| Prime Minister before | Prime Minister after |
|---|---|
| Konstantinos Kanaris; Russian Party | Alexandros Koumoundouros; Russian Party |

Parliamentary elections were held in Greece on 14 May 1865. Supporters of Alexandros Koumoundouros emerged as the largest bloc in Parliament, holding 95 of the 170 seats. Koumoundouros remained Prime Minister until 1 November, when he was replaced by Epameinondas Deligiorgis.

== Results ==
| Party | Seats |
|---|---|
| Supporters of Alexandros Koumoundouros | 95 |
| Supporters of Dimitrios Voulgaris | 40 |
| Supporters of King Otto | 35 |
| Total | 170 |
Source: Nohlen & Stöver

== Elected Deputies ==
| Constituency | Deputies | Faction | Notes |
|---|---|---|---|
| Aegina | Aiakos Logiotatidis | | |
| Aigialeia | Konstantinos Theodorou | Koumoundouros | |
| Aigialeia | Andreas K. Michalopoulos | | |
| Andros | Anagnostis Giannoulidis | Deligeorgis | |
| Andros | Michael D. Kairis | Deligeorgis | |
| Andros | Nikolaos P. Kairis | Deligeorgis | |
| Argos | D. Lambrinidis | Deligeorgis | |
| Argos | Konstantinos Mavousakis | Koumoundouros | |
| Argos | Dimitrios Tsokris | Koumoundouros | |
| Attica | Dimitrios Kallifronas | Deligeorgis | |
| Attica | Panagis Kyriakos | Deligeorgis | |
| Attica | Othon Makrygiannis | Deligeorgis | |
| Attica | Aristidis Balanos | Deligeorgis | |
| Attica | Periklis Petrakis | Koumoundouros | |
| Chalcis | Avgerinos Averof | Koumoundouros | |
| Chalcis | Nikolaos Boudouris | Voulgaris | |
| Chalcis | Dimitrios N. Kriezotis | | |
| Chalcis | Konstantinos Petsalis | | |
| Corfu | Theodoros Zervos | Koumoundouros | |
| Corfu | Nikolaos Karydis | Deligeorgis | |
| Corfu | Sokratis Kouris | Deligeorgis | |
| Corfu | Polychronis V. Konstantas | Deligeorgis | |
| Corfu | Nikolaos Louvros | Koumoundouros | |
| Corfu | Nikolaos Pangratis | | |
| Corfu | Stefanos Padovas | Deligeorgis | |
| Corfu | Theodoros Romaios | Koumoundouros | |
| Corfu | Georgios Markoras | | resigned 23 November 1866 |
| Corinthia | Anastasios Dimitriadis | Deligeorgis | |
| Corinthia | Ioannis Ioannou | Deligeorgis | |
| Corinthia | Efthymios Kanellopoulos | Koumoundouros | |
| Corinthia | Andreas Notaras | Koumoundouros | |
| Corinthia | Efstathios Ikonomopoulos | Koumoundouros | |
| Dorida | Christos Mastrapas | Deligeorgis | |
| Dorida | Ioannis Safakas | Deligeorgis | resigned 7 October 1867 |
| Elis | Alekos Acholos | Voulgaris | |
| Elis | Alexis Vilaetis | | |
| Elis | Lykourgos Krestenitis | Koumoundouros | |
| Elis | Christodoulos Steriopoulos | Koumoundouros | |
| Elis | Stefanos Stefanopoulos | Koumoundouros | |
| Epidavros Limira | Georgios Zoumboulakis | Deligeorgis | |
| Epidavros Limira | Nikolaos Papamichalopoulos | Voulgaris | |
| Ermionida | P. Gouzouasis | Koumoundouros | |
| Ermionida | Antonios S. Mitsas | Deligeorgis | |
| Evrytania | Georgios Apostolidis | Koumoundouros | |
| Evrytania | Dimitrios Zotos | Deligeorgis | |
| Evrytania | Panos Manolidis | Deligeorgis | |
| Evrytania | Dimitrios Tsitsaras | Koumoundouros | |
| Gortynia | Antonios Antonopoulos | Koumoundouros | |
| Gortynia | Athanasios Gontikas | | |
| Gortynia | Efthymios Deligiannis | Koumoundouros | |
| Gortynia | Georgios D. Plapoutas | Koumoundouros | |
| Gortynia | Ch. Sakellariadis | Deligeorgis | |
| Gytheio | Ilias-Vidis Mavromichalis | Deligeorgis | |
| Gytheio | Leonidas Petropoulakis | Voulgaris | |
| Hydra | Dimitrios Voulgaris | Voulgaris | |
| Hydra | Andreas Kountouriotis | Voulgaris | resigned 13 October 1867, replaced by Ioannis Kalogiannis |
| Hydra | Athanasios Miaoulis | | died June 1867, replaced by Th. Kountouriotis on 13 October 1867 |
| Ithaca | Anastasios Michalopoulos | Koumoundouros | |
| Ithaca | Konstantinos D. Petalas | Deligeorgis | |
| Kalamai | Periklis Mavromichalis | Deligeorgis | |
| Kalamai | Georgios Perrotis | Koumoundouros | |
| Kalamai | Ioannis Flessas | Deligeorgis | |
| Kalavryta | Ioannis Zaimis | | |
| Kalavryta | Andreas Ikonomopoulos | Koumoundouros | |
| Kalavryta | Ioannis Papadopoulos | Voulgaris | |
| Kalavryta | Leonidas Petimezas | Deligeorgis | |
| Kalavryta | Sotirios N. Petimezas | Deligeorgis | |
| Karystia | Konstantinos Dimitriadis | Deligeorgis | |
| Karystia | Alexandros A. Kontostavlos | Koumoundouros | |
| Karystia | Ioannis Balafas | Koumoundouros | |
| Kea | Konstantinos Kypriadis | Koumoundouros | |
| Kea | Triantafyllos Lazaretos | Koumoundouros | |
| Kefallinia | Anastasios Anninos | Koumoundouros | |
| Kefallinia | Gerasimos Antypas | Koumoundouros | |
| Kefallinia | Nikolaos F. Georgakatos | | resigned 20 November 1867 |
| Kefallinia | Antonios Zervos | Koumoundouros | |
| Kefallinia | Georgios Typaldos-Iakovatos | | resigned 5 May 1867 |
| Kefallinia | Charalambos Typaldos-Iakovatos | | resigned 5 May 1867 |
| Kefallinia | Gerasimos Livadas | Deligeorgis | |
| Kefallinia | Gerasimos Mavrogiannis | Koumoundouros | |
| Kefallinia | L. Tsouganatos | Koumoundouros | |
| Kefallinia | Georgios Florias | Koumoundouros | |
| Kynouria | Dimitrios Vrontisis | Koumoundouros | |
| Kynouria | Spyridon Papadopoulos | | |
| Kynouria | Dimitrios Papanikolaou | Deligeorgis | |
| Kynouria | Charalambis A. Christopoulos | | |
| Kythira | Georgios Aronis-Panagiotopoulos | Koumoundouros | |
| Kythira | Emmanouil Kontoleon | Deligeorgis | |
| Kythira | Kosmas Panaretos | Koumoundouros | |
| Lacedaemon | Ioannis Valassopoulos | | |
| Lacedaemon | Spyridon Kopanitsas | | |
| Lacedaemon | Anastasios Korfiotakis | Koumoundouros | |
| Lacedaemon | Ioannis A. Korfiotakis | Koumoundouros | |
| Lacedaemon | Spyridon Spiliotakis | Koumoundouros | |
| Lefkada | Aristotelis Valaoritis | | |
| Lefkada | Gerasimos Servos | Deligeorgis | |
| Lefkada | Alexandros Stamatopoulos | Deligeorgis | |
| Livadeia | Georgios Lappas | Koumoundouros | |
| Livadeia | Vasilios Spyropoulos | Deligeorgis | |
| Locris | Dimitrios Papaloukas | Koumoundouros | |
| Locris | Dimitrios Tsamopoulos | Koumoundouros | |
| Mantineia | Vasilios Dimitrakopoulos | Koumoundouros | |
| Mantineia | Georgios Boukidis | Deligeorgis | |
| Mantineia | Spyridon Ikonomidis | Koumoundouros | |
| Mantineia | Anagnostis Stavropoulos | Koumoundouros | |
| Mantineia | Christos A. Christopoulos | Deligeorgis | |
| Megalopoli | Asimakis Zatounitis | Koumoundouros | |
| Megalopoli | Athanasios Sinaniotis | Deligeorgis | |
| Megaris | Ioannis Alexiou | Koumoundouros | |
| Megaris | Xenofon Logothetis | Koumoundouros | |
| Messini | Panagiotis Kalamariotis | Koumoundouros | |
| Messini | Alexandros Koumoundouros | Koumoundouros | |
| Messini | Periklis P. Boutos | Koumoundouros | |
| Milos | Petros Modinos | Koumoundouros | |
| Milos | Ioannis Provelengios | Koumoundouros | |
| Missolonghi | Epaminondas Deligeorgis | Deligeorgis | |
| Missolonghi | Charilaos Trikoupis | | |
| Nafpaktia | Nikolaos Kanavos | Deligeorgis | |
| Nafpaktia | Ioannis Protopappas | Deligeorgis | |
| Nafpaktia | Nikolaos Farmakis | Deligeorgis | |
| Nafplia | Konstantinos Efthymiopoulos | | |
| Nafplia | Grigorios Ypsilantis | | |
| Naxos | Nikolaos Kontaratos | Koumoundouros | |
| Naxos | Emmanouil V. Nafpliotis | Koumoundouros | |
| Naxos | Aristidis Raftopoulos | | |
| Oitylo | Ioannis Katsakos | | |
| Oitylo | Alexandros Koumoundourakis | Koumoundouros | |
| Oitylo | Petros Leotsakos | Voulgaris | |
| Oitylo | Antonis A. Mavromichalis | Deligeorgis | |
| Olympia | Charalambos Kanellopoulos | Deligeorgis | |
| Olympia | Konstantinos Ikonomopoulos | Koumoundouros | |
| Olympia | Charalampos Christopoulos | | |
| Parnassida | Loukas Karalivanos | | |
| Parnassida | Efthymios Kechagias | Koumoundouros | |
| Parnassida | Spyridon Kremezis | Koumoundouros | |
| Patron | Benizelos Roufos | | |
| Patron | Aristidis Boukaouris | Koumoundouros | |
| Patron | Andreas Rigopoulos | Voulgaris | |
| Patron | Athanasios Kanakaris-Roufos | | |
| Paxoi | Dimitrios Makris | Koumoundouros | |
| Phthiotis | T. Plessas | Deligeorgis | |
| Phthiotis | Dimitrios Tsirimokos | Deligeorgis | |
| Phthiotis | Dimitrios Chatziskos | Deligeorgis | |
| Phthiotis | Athanasios Chatzopoulos | Koumoundouros | |
| Nea Psara | Dimitrios Valavanis | | |
| Nea Psara | Konstantinos Kanaris | | replaced by G. Stamataras since 1866 |
| Pylia | Konstantinos Dariotis | Koumoundouros | |
| Pylia | Athanasios Misyrlis | Koumoundouros | |
| Skopelos | Ioannis Doulidis | Deligeorgis | |
| Skopelos | Konstantinos Melachrinos | Deligeorgis | |
| Spetses | Dimitrios Theocharis | Deligeorgis | |
| Syros | Miltiadis Kanaris | Deligeorgis | |
| Syros | Achillefs Metaxas | Koumoundouros | |
| Syros | Georgios Bouboulis | | |
| Syros | Konstantinos Platys | Deligeorgis | |
| Thebes | Loukas Katsinas | Deligeorgis | |
| Thira | Ioannis Vlavianos | Deligeorgis | |
| Thira | Anagnostis Dimitriou | Koumoundouros | |
| Thira | Petros Zannos | Deligeorgis | resigned 8 December 1867 |
| Thira | Spyridon Malaspinas | Koumoundouros | |
| Tinos | Matthaios Gianoulis | | |
| Tinos | Iakovos Paximadis | Koumoundouros | |
| Tinos | Efstratios Parisis | Koumoundouros | died November 1865, replaced by Michael E. Parisis |
| Trichonida | Dimitrios Botsaris | Deligeorgis | |
| Trichonida | Vasilios D. Skaltsodimos | Koumoundouros | |
| Trifylia | Athanasios Grigoriadis | Voulgaris | |
| Trifylia | Zikos Mavroidis | Deligeorgis | |
| Trifylia | Sotirios Sotiropoulos | Koumoundouros | |
| Troizinia | Spyridon Karamanos | Koumoundouros | |
| Troizinia | Stamatios Korizis | Koumoundouros | |
| Valtos | Spyridon Karaiskakis | Deligeorgis | |
| Valtos | Andreas Stratos | Koumoundouros | |
| Vonitsa-Xiromero | Georgios Gerothanasis | Deligeorgis | |
| Vonitsa-Xiromero | Dimitrios Grivas | | |
| Vonitsa-Xiromero | Panagiotis I. Petimezis | Deligeorgis | |
| Xirochori | Tilemachos Roukis | | |
| Xirochori | Kimon Christodoulou | Koumoundouros | |
| Zakynthos | Spyridon Leontarakis | Koumoundouros | |
| Zakynthos | Konstantinos Lomvardos | Koumoundouros | |
| Zakynthos | Dimitrios I. Patelis | Koumoundouros | |
| Zakynthos | Ioannis Plaissas | Koumoundouros | |
| Zakynthos | Andreas Foskardis-Gaitas | Koumoundouros | |
