= Charalambos (given name) =

Charalambos may refer to:

- Saint Charalambos (Greek: Άγιος Χαράλαμπος), early Christian bishop in Magnesia on the Maeander, a region of Asia Minor

Other notable people called Charalambos include:

- Charalambos D. Aliprantis (1946–2009), Greek-American economist and mathematician
- Charalambos Andreou (born 1967), former international Cypriot football striker
- Charalambos Aristotelous (born 1995), Cypriot footballer
- Charalambos Avgerinos, Greek politician, father of Nakis Avgerinos
- Bambos Charalambous (Charalambos Charalambous, born 1967), British Member of Parliament
- Charalambos Cholidis (born 1956), Greek former wrestler who competed in four Summer Olympics
- Charalambos Christodoulou (born 1967), Cypriot football manager
- Charalambos Dimarchopoulos (born 1964), Greek politician and mayor
- Charalambos Giannopoulos (born 1989), Greek professional basketball player
- Charalambos Katsimitros (1886–1962), Greek general during the Italian invasion of Greece
- Charalambos Kostoulas (born 2007), Greek footballer
- Charalambos Kyriakou (footballer, born 1989) (born 1989), Cypriot footballer
- Charalambos Kyriakou (footballer, born 1995) (born 1995), Cypriot footballer
- Charalambos Lykogiannis (born 1993), Greek footballer
- Charalambos Markopoulos (born 1982), Greek professional basketball player and coach
- Charalambos Moisiadis (born 1976), Greek footballer
- Charalambos Oikonomopoulos (born 1991), Greek footballer
- Charalambos Pachis (1844–1891), Greek painter of the Heptanese school
- Charalambos Papadias (born 1975), retired Greek sprinter who specialized in the 100 metres
- Charalambos Sarafoglou (born 1993), Greek footballer
- Charalambos Siligardakis (born 1982), professional footballer
- Charalambos Simopoulos (1874–1942), Greek diplomat, ambassador to London during the Second World War
- Charalambos Tabasis (born 1986), retired Greek football player
- Charalambos Theopemptou (born 1955), Greek Cypriot politician
- Charalambos Tseroulis (1879–1929), Greek infantry officer, became Lieutenant General
- Charalambos Vilaetis (1781–1821), Greek revolutionary leader
- Charalambos Xanthopoulos (born 1956), former Greek footballer
- Charalambos Zouras (1885–1972), Greek athlete who competed in the 1908 Summer Olympics

== See also ==
- Saint Charalambos Church, Iași, Romanian Orthodox church located in Iași, Romania
- Agios Charalambos, Thessaloniki village of the Langadas municipality
- Haralamb (disambiguation)
