= Leonida =

Leonida is a given name and a surname which may refer to:

== Given name ==
- Leonida Bagration of Mukhrani (1914–2010), wife of Vladimir Kirillovich, Grand Duke of Russia, a pretender to the Russian throne
- Leonida Barboni (1909–1970), Italian film cinematographer
- Leonida Bertos, birth name of Leo Bertos (born 1981), New Zealander footballer
- Leonida Bissolati (1857–1920), Italian socialist politician
- Leonida T. Boga (1886–1974), Aromanian writer, schoolteacher and archivist in Romania
- Leonida Caraiosifoglu (1944–2024), Romanian racewalker
- Leonida Frascarelli (1906–1991), Italian cyclist
- Leonida Gichevska (born 1998), Macedonian handballer
- Leonida Gianturco, anonymous pen name of antifascist activist Leone Ginzburg (1909–1944)
- Leonida Nikolai Giovannelli (1906–1980s), Italian-born Manx writer
- Leonida Kasaya (born 1993), Kenyan volleyball player
- Leonida Lari (1949–2011), Romanian poet, journalist, and politician from the Republic of Moldova
- Leonida Lucchetta (1911–?), Italian former footballer
- Leonida Nedelcu (born 1952), Romanian footballer
- Leonida Pallotta (1910–?), Italian former football goalkeeper
- Leonida Rèpaci (1898–1985), Italian writer and political activist
- Leonida Rosino (1917–1997), Italian astronomer
- Leonida Svitlychna (1924–2003), Ukrainian human rights activist
- Leonida Tonelli (1885–1946), Italian mathematician
- Leonida Țurcan (1894–?), Bessarabian politician

== Surname ==
- Florica Leonida (born 1987), Romanian retired artistic gymnast
- Dimitrie Leonida (1883–1965), Romanian engineer
- Gheorghe Leonida (1892 or 1893–1942), Romanian sculptor
- Elisa Leonida Zamfirescu (1887–1973), Romanian engineer

== See also ==
- Leonidha
- Leonid
- Leonidas (disambiguation)
