= Varouxis =

Varouxis is a surname. Notable people with the surname include:

- Konstantinos Varouxis, Greek journalist
- Leonidas Varouxis, Greek journalist
