= Laconic phrase =

Terse philosophical saying

A laconic phrase or laconism is a concise or terse statement, especially a blunt and elliptical rejoinder. It is named after Laconia, the region of Greece including the city of Sparta, whose ancient inhabitants had a reputation for verbal austerity and were famous for their often pithy remarks.

== Uses ==
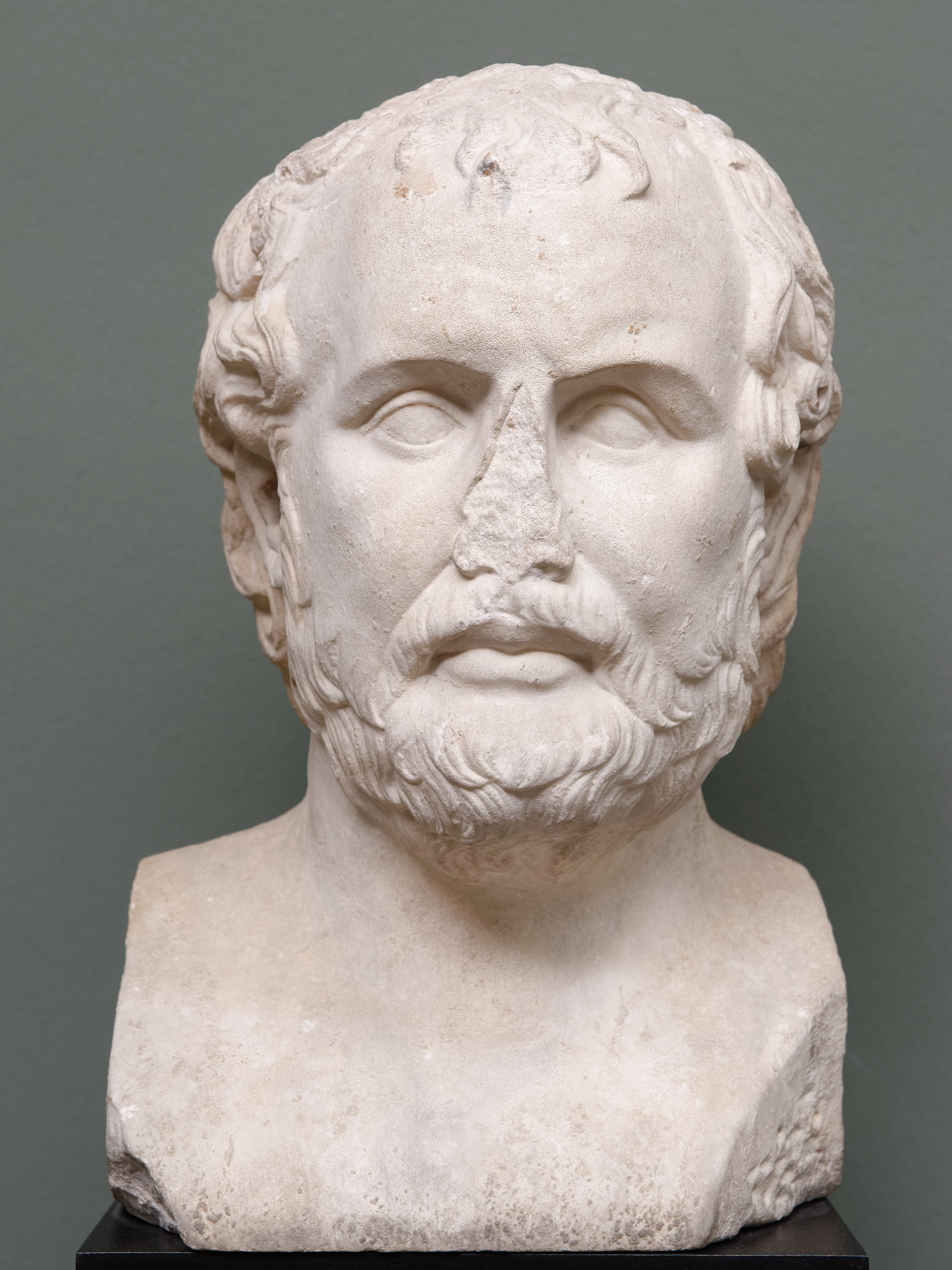
Bust of Philip II of Macedon

A laconic phrase may be used for efficiency (as during military training and operations), for emphasis, for philosophical reasons (especially among thinkers who believe in minimalism, such as Stoics), or to deflate a pompous speaker.

A prominent example of a laconism involving Philip II of Macedon was reported by the historian Plutarch. After invading southern Greece and receiving the submission of other key city-states, Philip turned his attention to Sparta and asked menacingly whether he should come as friend or foe. The reply was "Neither."

Losing patience, he sent the message:

If I invade Laconia, I shall turn you out.

The Spartan ephors again replied with a single word:

If.

Philip proceeded to invade Laconia, devastate much of it, and eject the Spartans from various parts. (Note: Sparta then declined to participate in Macedon's invasion of the Persian Empire, a fact memorialized in a proclamation Alexander sent to Athens with armor captured at the Battle of the Granicus: "Alexander, son of Philip, and all the Greeks except the Lacedaemonians, present this offering from the spoils taken from the foreigners inhabiting Asia.")

=== In humor ===
The Spartans were especially famous for their dry, understated wit which is now known as "laconic humor". This can be contrasted with the "Attic salt" or "Attic wit" – the refined, poignant, delicate humour of Sparta's chief rival, Athens.

Various groups in more recent history also have a reputation for laconic humor: Icelanders in the sagas, and, in the Anglophone world, Australians (cf. Australian humor), American cowboys, New Englanders, and people from Northern England and Scotland.

== History ==
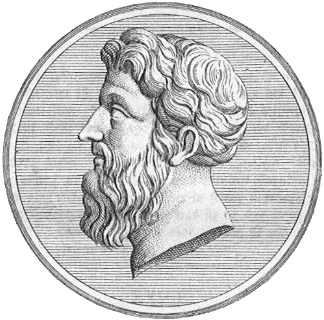
Chilon of Sparta

Spartans paid less attention than other ancient Greeks to the development of education, arts, and literature. Some view this as having contributed to the characteristically blunt Laconian speech. However, Socrates, in Plato's dialogue Protagoras, appears to reject the idea that Spartans' economy with words was simply a consequence of poor literary education: "... they conceal their wisdom, and pretend to be blockheads, so that they may seem to be superior only because of their prowess in battle ... This is how you may know that I am speaking the truth and that the Spartans are the best educated in philosophy and speaking: if you talk to any ordinary Spartan, he seems to be stupid, but eventually, like an expert marksman, he shoots in some brief remark that proves you to be only a child". (Note: An alternative translation based on those by A. Beresford and R.E. Allen is as follows: "...they claim not to have any interest in [philosophy] and put on this big show of being morons...because...they want people to think that their superiority rests on fighting battles and being manly... You can tell that what I say is true, and that Spartans are the best educated in philosophy and argument, by this: if one associates with the most inferior Spartan, one at first finds him somewhat inferior in speech; but then at some chance point in the discussion he throws in a remark worthy of noticing, brief and terse, like a skilled marksman, so that the person he's talking to appears no better than a child.") Socrates was known to have admired Spartan laws, as did many other Athenians, but modern scholars have doubted the seriousness of his attribution of a secret love of philosophy to Spartans. Still, the Spartans Myson of Chenae and Chilon of Sparta have traditionally been counted among the Seven Sages of Greece; both were famous for many laconic sayings. (Note: Examples include "We should not investigate facts by the light of arguments, but arguments by the light of facts" for Myson, and "Do not let one's tongue outrun one's sense" for Chilon.)

In general, however, Spartans were expected to be men of few words, to hold rhetoric in disdain, and to stick to the point. Loquacity was considered frivolous and unbecoming of sensible, down-to-earth Spartan warriors. A Spartan youth was reportedly liable to have his thumb bitten as punishment for too verbose a response to a teacher's question.

== Examples ==
=== Spartan ===
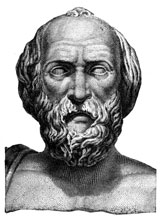
Lycurgus

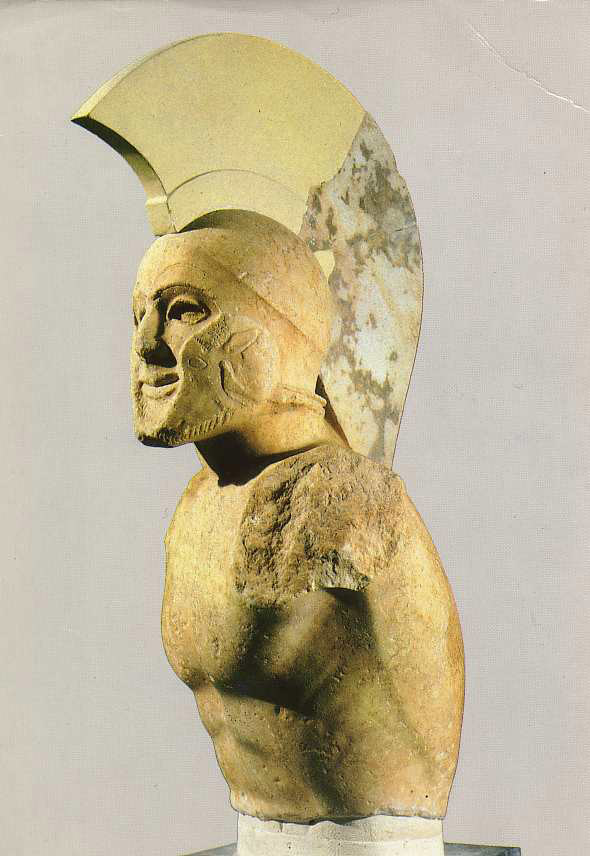
Leonidas, a sculpture (c. 475 BCE) unearthed in Sparta in 1926 (Archaeological Museum of Sparta)

- A witticism attributed to Lycurgus, the possibly legendary lawgiver of Sparta, was a response to a proposal to set up a democracy there: "Begin with your own family."
- On another occasion, Lycurgus was reportedly asked the reason for the less-than-extravagant size of Sparta's sacrifices to the gods. He replied, "So that we may always have something to offer."
- When he was consulted on how Spartans might best forestall invasion of their homeland, Lycurgus advised, "By remaining poor, and each man not desiring to possess more than his fellow."
- When asked whether it would be prudent to build a defensive wall enclosing the city, Lycurgus answered, "A city is well-fortified which has a wall of men instead of brick." (When another Spartan was later shown an Asian city with impressive fortifications, he remarked, "Fine quarters for women!")
- Responding to a visitor who questioned why they put their fields in the hands of the helots rather than cultivate them themselves, Anaxandridas explained, "It was not by taking care of the fields, but of ourselves, that we acquired those fields."
- King Demaratus, being pestered by someone with a question concerning who the most exemplary Spartan was, answered "He that is least like you."
- On her husband Leonidas's departure for battle with the Persians at Thermopylae, Gorgo, Queen of Sparta asked what she should do. He advised her: "Marry a good man and bear good children."
- Two examples from the Spartans (recorded by Herodotus), both concerning the Battle of Thermopylae, which have been featured in modern depictions of that battle, including the films The 300 Spartans and 300. The first is a boast from one of the Persians that when battle is joined, "our arrows will block out the sun!" The Spartans nonchalantly responded: "then we will fight in the shade." The second concerns a Persian commander's demand that the Spartans and their allies surrender and lay down their weapons. The Spartans, deployed for battle, responded: "Come and take them!"
- In an account from Herodotus, "When the banished Samians reached Sparta, they had audience of the magistrates, before whom they made a long speech, as was natural with persons greatly in want of aid. When it was over, the Spartans averred that they could no longer remember the first half of their speech, and thus could make nothing of the remainder. Afterwards the Samians had another audience, whereat they simply said, showing a bag which they had brought with them, 'The bag wants flour.' The Spartans answered that they did not need to have said 'the bag'; however, they resolved to give them aid."
- Polycratidas was one of several Spartans sent on a diplomatic mission to some Persian generals, and being asked whether they came in a private or a public capacity, answered, "If we succeed, public; if not, private."
- Following the disastrous sea battle of Cyzicus, the admiral Mindarus's first mate dispatched a succinct distress signal to Sparta. The message was intercepted by the Athenians and was recorded by Xenophon in his Hellenica: "Ships gone; Mindarus dead; the men starving; at our wits' end what to do".

== See also ==
- Aphorism
- Atticism
- Nuts!
- One-line joke
