= Vilaetis =

Vilaetis is a surname. Notable people with the surname include:

- Charalambos Vilaetis (1781–1821), Greek revolutionary leader
- Lysandros Vilaetis, Greek politician
- Nikolaos Vilaetis (1835–1860), Greek politician
