= Lucchetta =

Lucchetta is an Italian surname. Notable people with the surname include:

- Andrea Lucchetta (born 1962), Italian volleyball player
- Dino Lucchetta (born 1968), Italian rowing coxswain
- Leonida Lucchetta (born 1911, date of death unknown), Italian footballer
- Pier Paolo Lucchetta (born 1963), Italian volleyball player
