= Leonidas (given name) =

Leonidas is a masculine given name mainly in Greece. People with the name include:

== In military ==
- Leonidas M. Godley, American Civil War Union Army soldier; recipient of the Medal of Honor
- Leonidas Paraskevopoulos, Greek military officer and politician
- Leonidas Polk, Confederate general in the American Civil War
- Leonidas I. Robinson, American Coast Guard third lieutenant

== In politics ==
- Leonidas Burwell, Canadian businessman and politician
- Leonidas Kouris, Greek politician
- Leonidas Kyrkos, Greek politician
- Leonidas Pantelides, Cypriot diplomat
- Leonidas Paraskevopoulos, Greek military officer and politician
- Leonidas L. Polk, American agrarian leader and North Carolina's first Commissioner of Agriculture
- Leonidas Shaver, American judge from the Utah Territory
- Leonidas Jefferson Storey, American politician from Texas
- Leonidas Varouxis, Greek journalist and a politician

== In sport ==
=== Football ===
- Leônidas (footballer, born 1913), Brazilian football player born 1913
- Leônidas (footballer, born 1995), Brazilian football player born 1995
- Leônidas Soares Damasceno, Brazilian football player
- Leonidas Ferreira de Paulo Junior, Brazilian football player
- Leonidas Kampantais, Greek footballer
- Leonidas Panagopoulos, Greek footballer
- Leonidas Vokolos, Greek footballer

=== Other sports ===
- Leonidas Bott, Australian cricketer
- Leonidas Langakis, Greek shooter
- Leonidas Pyrgos, Greek fencer
- Leonidas Sampanis, Greek weightlifter
- Leonidas Skoutaris, Greek basketball player
- Leonidas Tsiklitiras, Greek gymnast

== In other fields ==
- Leonidas Kestekides, founder of the Belgian chocolate company
- Leonidas Alaoglu, American mathematician of Greek descent
- Leonidas Hamline, 19th-century American Methodist clergyman and lawyer, and founding benefactor of Hamline University
- Leonidas Kavakos, Greek violinist
- Leonidas Varouxis, Greek journalist and a politician
- Leonidas Vargas, Colombian drug lord
- Leonidas Veliaroutis, Greek writer

== See also ==
- Leonidas (disambiguation)#People
