= Andreas Stefanopoulos =

Greek politician

- Ανδρέας Στεφανόπουλος
- Born: 1860; Pyrgos, Elis, Greece
- Died: 1938 (aged 77–78); Greece
- Occupation: politician
- Relatives: Christos Stefanopoulos (brother)

Andreas Stefanopoulos (Greek: Ανδρέας Στεφανόπουλος, 1860–1938), was a Greek politician, who served in the Greek parliament and the Greek Senate, amongst other roles.

Andreas Stephanopoulos was born in Pyrgos and was the son of Stephanos Stephanopoulos, a politician and member of the historic Stephanopoulos family. His brother was politician Christos Stefanopoulos. He studied law and political sciences in Athens and Paris and was educated early as a politician.

He was elected as a representative for Elis in the Greek parliament in 1892 with Charilaos Trikoupis' party and was re-elected every time until 1929. Then he became a senator, until the Greek Senate was abolished in 1935. He was Minister for Naval Affairs in the 1903 cabinet of Georgios Theotokis; and the Minister for Education in the 1905 cabinet of Theotokis. He died in 1938.
