= Matesi =

Matesi Μάτεσι
- Community
- Location within Greece
- Coordinates: 37°32′N 21°55′E
- Country: Greece
- Administrative region: West Greece
- Regional unit: Elis
- Municipality: Andritsaina-Krestena
- Municipal unit: Andritsaina

Population (2021)
  - Community: 56
- Time zone: UTC+2 (EET)
  - Summer (DST): UTC+3 (EEST)

Matesi (Greek: Μάτεσι) is a small mountain village in the municipal unit of Andritsaina, Elis, Greece.It is located on a hill above the left bank of the river Alfeios. It is 3 km northwest of Theisoa, 6 km east of Alifeira and 6 km northeast of Andritsaina.

Nearby, some ancient tombs from the last centuries BC were found.

== Population ==
Year	Population
1981	144
1991	137
2001	101
2011	109
2021	56

== See also ==
- List of settlements in Elis
