= Theisoa, Greece =

Theisoa Θεισόα
- Community
- Location within Greece
- Coordinates: 37°31′N 21°58′E
- Country: Greece
- Administrative region: West Greece
- Regional unit: Elis
- Municipality: Andritsaina-Krestena
- Municipal unit: Andritsaina

Population (2021)
  - Community: 50
- Time zone: UTC+2 (EET)
  - Summer (DST): UTC+3 (EEST)

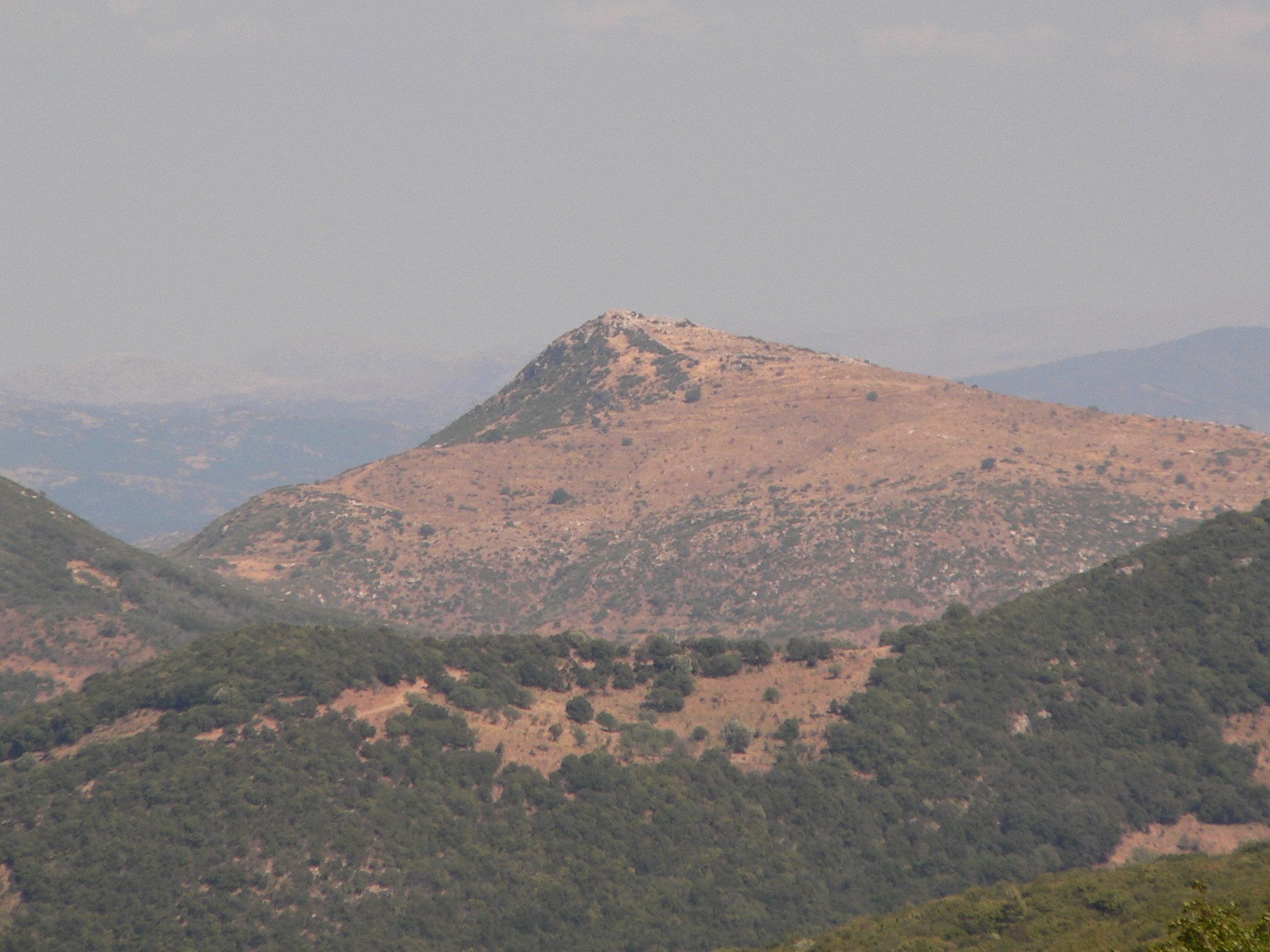
Theoisa seen from the north side

Theisoa (Greek: Θεισόα, before 1915: Λάβδα - Lavda) is a mountain village in the municipal unit Andritsaina, Elis, southwestern Greece. Theisoa is situated on a mountain slope above the left bank of the river Alfeios, 3 km southeast of Matesi, 3 km northeast of Rovia, 6 km northeast of connected Andritsaina and 8 km northwest of Karytaina. The Greek National Road 76 (Megalopoli - Andritsaina - Krestena) passes through the village.

== Population ==
Year	Population
1981	134
1991	198
2001	129
2011	89
2021	50

== Notable people ==
- Ioannis Paraskevopoulos (1900–1984) banker and politician, former Prime Minister of Greece.

== See also ==
- List of settlements in Elis
