= Christos Daralexis =

Greek historian, politician and theatrical writer

Christos Daralexis Χρήστος Δαραλέξης
- Born: 1870; Pyrgos, Elis, Greece
- Died: 1951; Athens, Greece
- Occupation(s): historian, linguist

Christos Daralexis (Greek: Χρήστος Δαραλέξης, 1870 - 1951) was a Greek historian, a politician and a theatrical writer.

== Biography ==
Daralexis was born in Pyrgos, Elis, and was a relative of the Avgerinos family. He was a well minded Athenian and one of the courteous changes in Athens' aristocracy. He was elected a politician in 1900. He tried vainly and repeatedly elected in the next elections from 1904 until 1910. It was a union member of the Journalists' Union of the Athens Daily Newspapers (ESIEA) and ran president. One of the theatrical works that he completed was Faia kai Nymfaia (Φαιά και Νυμφαία).
