= Charalambous =

Charalambous is a Cypriot surname. Notable people include:

- Andrew Charalambous (born 1967), British businessman
- Angelis Charalambous (born 1989), Cypriot footballer
- Bambos Charalambous (born 1967), British Labour Party politician
- Elias Charalambous (born 1980), Cypriot footballer
- Marios Charalambous (born 1969), Cypriot footballer
- Michalis Charalambous (born 1999), Cypriot footballer
- Zacharias Charalambous (born 1971), Cypriot footballer

== See also ==
- Charalambos (given name)
