= Diakos =

Diakos (Greek: Διάκος) means deacon in Greek and may refer to:

- Athanasios Diakos (1788–1821), military commander during the Greek War of Independence
  - Athanasios Diakos, Greece, a mountain village in Phocis, Greece
  - Athanasiou Diakou Street, Athens, Greece
- Ioannis Diakos (1805-1887), military commander during the Greek War of Independence

== See also ==
- Diakou, Patras, Greece
