= Rovia =

Rovia Ρόβια
- Community
- Location within Greece
- Coordinates: 37°29′N 21°56′E
- Country: Greece
- Administrative region: West Greece
- Regional unit: Elis
- Municipality: Andritsaina-Krestena
- Municipal unit: Andritsaina

Population (2021)
  - Community: 57
- Time zone: UTC+2 (EET)
  - Summer (DST): UTC+3 (EEST)

Rovia (Greek: Ρόβια) is a little mountain village in the municipal unit of Andritsaina, Elis, Greece. Rovia is situated on a mountain slope, 2 km southeast of Karmio, 3 km southwest of Theisoa and 3 km east of Andritsaina.

== Population ==
Year	Population
1700	20
1830	95
1907	235
1920	254
1928	247
1940	249
1960	227
1960	151
1970	75
1981	97
1991	200
2001	44
2011	37
2021	57

== See also ==
- List of settlements in Elis
