= Liourdis =

Liourdis (Greek: Λιούρδης) is a Greek surname. Notable people with the surname include:

- Ioannis Liourdis (c.1800–1899), Greek politician
- Giannis Liourdis (born 1979), Greek footballer and coach
