= Leonida (disambiguation) =

Leonida is a given name and a surname.

Leonida may also refer to:

- Leonida, designer and manufacturer of Romanian tank destroyers TACAM R-2
- Leonida, fictional planet in the Noon Universe by Russian science fiction writers Strugatsky brothers
- Leonida, a fictional U.S. state based on Florida featured in Grand Theft Auto VI

== See also ==
- Leonidas (disambiguation)
