= Krestenitis =

Krestenitis (Greek: Κρεστενίτης) is a Greek surname. Notable people with the surname include:

- Georgios Krestenitis, Greek politician
- Ioannis Krestenitis (elder), revolutionary leader of the Greek War of Independence
- Ioannis Krestenitis (younger) (died 1915), Greek politician
- Lykourgos Krestenitis (1793–1873), politician and a president of the Parliament of Greece
- Stamatis Krestenitis, revolutionary leader of the Greek War of Independence
