= Ioannis Krestenitis (elder) =

Greek revolutionary leader

Ioannis Krestenitis Ιωάννης Κρεστενίτης
- Born: Elis, (now Greece)
- Died: Greece
- Occupation: Greek revolutionary leader

Ioannis Krestenitis (Greek: Ιωάννης Κρεστενίτης) was a Greek revolutionary leader during the Greek War of Independence.

He was responsible for economics during the revolution in the province of Pyrgos. At the end, he retired from politics since he was old and moved with his brother Lykourgos Krestenitis.
