= Kerpini =

Kerpini Κερπινή
- Community
- Location within Greece
- Coordinates: 38°5′N 22°6′E
- Country: Greece
- Administrative region: West Greece
- Regional unit: Achaea
- Municipality: Kalavryta
- Municipal unit: Kalavryta

Population (2021)
  - Community: 96
- Time zone: UTC+2 (EET)
  - Summer (DST): UTC+3 (EEST)
- Vehicle registration: AX

Kerpini (Greek: Κερπινή), is a small mountain village in the north of the municipality of Kalavryta in Achaea, Greece. It is 5 km west of Kato Zachlorou and 5 km north of Kalavryta town.

== Notable people ==
Kerpini was the home of the Zaimis family which produced several revolutionary leaders and politicians:

- Andreas Zaimis (1791–1840), fighter in the Greek War of Independence
- Thrasyvoulos Zaimis (1822–1880), former Prime Minister of Greece
- Alexandros Zaimis (1855–1936), former Prime Minister of Greece, High Commissioner of Crete and President of Greece
- Theodoros Zaimis, physician

== Population ==
Year	Population
1981	287
1991	235
2001	207
2011	173
2021	96

== See also ==
- List of settlements in Achaea
