= Ioannis Zaimis =

Greek politician

Ioannis Zaimis Ιωάννης Ζαΐμης 1st Mayor of Patras June 26, 1836 - June 25, 1837
- Born: c. 1797; Kerpini, Ottoman Empire (now Greece)
- Died: 1882; Patras, Greece
- Occupations: politician, mayor of Patras

Ioannis Zaimis (Greek: Ιωάννης Ζαΐμης, c. 1797–1882) was a Greek MP for Achaia and the first Mayor of Patras.

He was born in about 1797 and was the son of Asimakis Zaimis, part of the famous Zaimis family that produced famous revolutionary heroes. He took part of the revolution of 1821 and battled for Patras. He married Angeliki Kanakari-Roufo. He became the first mayor of Patras in 1836 and was an antiroyalist. A year later, he would leave the mayor's seat and Ioannis Boukaouris took over as the second mayor. In the second municipal election in 1837, he was president of the municipal council. He was appointed MP for Kalavryta in 1841 and in 1843, he became a member of the municipal council again.

He died on September 24, 1882. He was uncle of the Prime Minister Thrasivoulos Zaimis.

Preceded by Dimitrios Retiniotis (chief)	Mayor of Patras (1836-1837)	Succeeded by Ioannis Boukaouris
