= Georgios Krestenitis =

Greek politician

Georgios Krestenitis Γεώργιος Κρεστενίτης
- Born: 19th century Elis, Greece
- Died: 20th century Greece
- Occupation: politician

Georgios Krestenitis (Greek: Γεώργιος Κρεστενίτης) was a Greek politician from Elis. He descended from the famous Krestenitis family which had many politicians. He was elected for the first time as a representative for Elis in the Greek parliament in 1879 and again in 1885, 1895, 1902 and 1905. He was elected as a representative for Achaea and Elis in 1912. He was the brother of Ioannis Krestenitis.
