= Konstantinos Nikolopoulos (composer) =

Greek composer and philologist

Konstantinos Agathophron Nikolopoulos (Greek: Κωνσταντίνος Αγαθόφρων Νικολόπουλος; c. 1786 – 12 June 1841) was a Greek composer, philologist and colleague of Adamantios Korais.

== Biography ==
Konstantinos Nikolopoulos was born in Smyrna, Ottoman Empire and grew up in Paris. Being somewhat of a "Renaissance Man" (that is, an individual with many varied skills and talents), he was employed as librarian in the French Institute, where he worked for much of his life.

He was a member of the Philiki Etaireia, the underground revolutionary Greek organization working for the liberation of the Greeks from the Ottoman Empire. He died in Paris, at the age of 55, while he donated his library to the municipality of Andritsaina, origin place of his father.

== Compositions ==
Josef Fink helped bring some fame to Nikolopoulos by referring to his compositions in "Die Arkadische Sendung Des Konstantinos Nikolopoulos" in 1980. Some of his works were based on Ancient Greek texts, while he composed also religious music. Some of his compositions include the following:

- Three Romances
- Ezekiel's Dream
- A Cantata for Palaeon Patron Germanos
- The Song of the Greek
- The Cry of the Greeks
- Prooemion to the Iliad
- Kyrie Eleison (religious)
