= Leonidha =

Leonidha is an Albanian masculine given name. Notable people with the surname include:

- Leonidha Çuri (born 1951), Albanian footballer and manager
- Leonidha Naçi (1875–1940), Albanian educator

== See also ==
- Leonida
