= Georgios Avgerinos =

Georgios Avgerinos Γεώργιος Αυγερινός
- Born: 18th century Elis, Greece
- Died: 19th century Greece
- Occupation: Writer

Georgios Avgerinos (Greek: Γεώργιος Αυγερινός, 18th century – 19th century) was a Greek trader and leader or the Greek War of Independence of 1821.

== Biography ==
He was a general leader of the Avgerinos family in which it ruled the main political view of a free Greece for up to a hundred years. The Avgerinos family descended from Avgerata in the island of Kefalonia in which they moved to the village of Douka in Elis. Later in 1770, after the destruction, the family relocated themselves to the city of Pyrgos.

Georgios Avgerinos appeared in 1778 as a secretary of the Turkish cattlers in Lalas and in Gastouni. He won the land over the Turks and sold his cattle in Zakynthos. He defended several privileges for the area of Pyrgos and a small stadium that evolved with the main usage of the draining works of the fields of Gastouni. He defended that he elevation in one of the notable powerful people of Pyrgos where he devoted a large part of his estate for the revolutionary period. In 1807, he welcomed Theodoros Kolokotronis and visited Zante.

After the liberation of Greece, he withdrew from the political races of the press. His sons were Dimitrios Avgerinos, Agamemnon Avgerinos and Christodoulos.
