= Haralamb =

Haralamb or Haralambie is an Aromanian- and Romanian-language male name (variant of Charalambos) that may refer to:

- Haralamb H. Georgescu
- Haralamb Lecca
- Haralamb Zincă
- Haralambie Corbu
- Haralambie Dumitraș
- Haralambie Eftimie
- Haralambie Ivanov
- Nicolae Haralambie
- Romice Haralambie
