= Ioannis Krestenitis (younger) =

Greek politician

Ioannis Krestenitis Ιωάννης Κρεστενίτης 3rd Mayor of Pyrgos
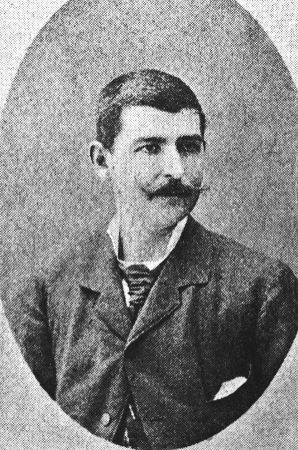
- Born: 19th century Greece
- Died: 1915; Greece
- Occupations: politician, mayor of Pyrgos

Ioannis Krestenitis (Greek: Ιωάννης Κρεστενίτης, died 1915) was a Greek politician and a mayor of Pyrgos. He came from the most famous Krestenitis family. He studied at the National University and attended with professor Lambros. He became mayor of Pyrgos in 1883 and was elected representative of Elis in the Greek parliament in 1887, 1889, 1906 and 1910. He denied in 1906 from the spot of the naval ministry with the explanation he did not participated with the succession of the throne. In 1891, he entered to the political spot and elected mayor of Pyrgos until 1899. In 1910, he was elected an attorney after the revolution. He died in 1915. He was the brother of Georgios Krestenitis.

Preceded by Petros Avgerinos	Mayor of Pyrgos (several terms); 1883-?	Succeeded by Konstantinos Zafiropoulos
