= Stephanopoulos =

Stephanopoulos, Stefanopoulos (Greek: Στεφανόπουλος), feminine: Stephanopoulou, Stefanopoulou (Στεφανοπούλου) is a Greek surname. Notable people with the surname include:

- Andreas Stephanopoulos (1860–1938), Greek politician
- Anna Stefanopoulou, Greek-American mechanical engineer
- Christos Stephanopoulos (1853–1918), Greek politician
- Konstantinos Stephanopoulos (1926–2016), Greek politician, President of Greece
- Fotini Dekazou Stefanopoulou, academic and politician
- George Stephanopoulos (born 1961), Greek-American journalist and political adviser
- Georgios Stephanopoulos (born 1962) Greek boxer
- Gregory Stephanopoulos, American chemical engineer and professor
- Maria Flytzani-Stephanopoulos (1950–2019) American chemical engineer
- Stefanos Stephanopoulos (1898–1982), Greek politician, Prime Minister of Greece
