= Stamatis Krestenitis =

Stamatis Krestenitis Σταμάτης Κρεστενίτης
- Born: Elis, (now Greece)
- Died: Greece
- Occupation: Greek revolutionary leader

Stamatis Krestenitis (Greek: Σταμάτης Κρεστενίτης) was a Greek revolutionary leader during the Greek War of Independence.

Krestenitis was born in Elis and belonged to the Krestenitis family. He battled in the Battle of Chlemoutsi together with Georgios Sisinis and Charalampos Vilaetis.
