= Saint Leonidas =

Saint Leonidas (or Leonides) refers to several Christian martyrs:

- An Egyptian who died in the Diocletianic Persecution (feast day 28 January)
- A companion of St. Diomedes (feast day 2 September)
- A 4th-century Eastern Orthodox martyr (feast day 8 August)
- A sixth-century Bishop of Athens (feast day 15 April)
- One of seven companions, including Callistus and Charysius, martyred in Corinth (feast day 16 April)
- Leonides of Alexandria, father of Origen (feast day 22 April)

== See also ==
- Leonidas (disambiguation)
