= USS Leonidas =

USS Leonidas may refer to the following ships of the United States Navy:

- USS Leonidas, a ship scuttled during the American Civil War as a part of the Stone Fleet
- USS Leonidas (AD-7), a ship in commission from 1898 to 1921 that operated as a collier, survey ship, and destroyer tender
