= Ioannis Diakos =

Greek revolutionary leader

Ioannis Diakos Ιωάννης Διάκος
- Born: c. 1805; Pyrgos, (now Greece)
- Died: 1887 (age 82); Patras, Greece
- Occupation: Greek revolutionary leader

Ioannis Diakos (Greek: Ιωάννης Διάκος, c. 1805-1887) was a Greek revolutionary leader during the Greek War of Independence. He was a chief of Pyrgos and battled during the Greek War of Independence and at the time, he was a general of Pyrgos. Petros Mitzos killed his father in 1823 in which that in the political battlefield he also killed Stamatis Krestenitis.
