= Archaeological Museum of Sparta =

Museum in Sparta, Greece

Coordinates: 37.0742°N 22.4316°E

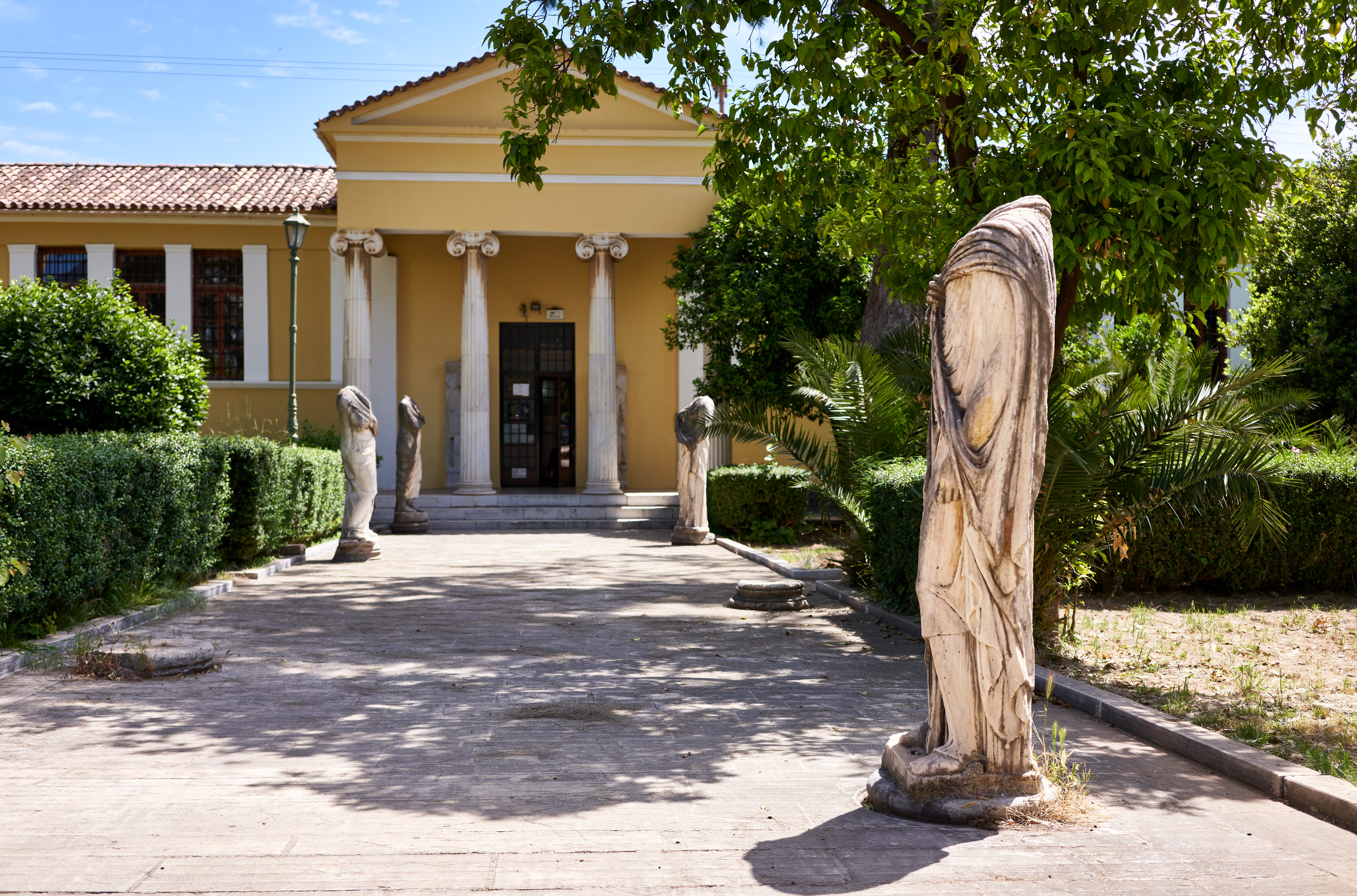
The Archaeological Museum of Sparta

The Archaeological Museum of Sparta (Greek: Αρχαιολογικό Μουσείο Σπάρτης), founded in 1875, is a museum in Sparta, Greece that houses thousands of artifacts from the ancient Acropolis of Sparta and the rest of the municipality of Laconia. It is one of Greece's oldest archaeology museums.

The collection's pieces date from the Neolithic to the late Roman era. There are seven rooms of an approximate area of 500 square metres (5,400 sq ft) which display only a small part of the collection.

== History ==
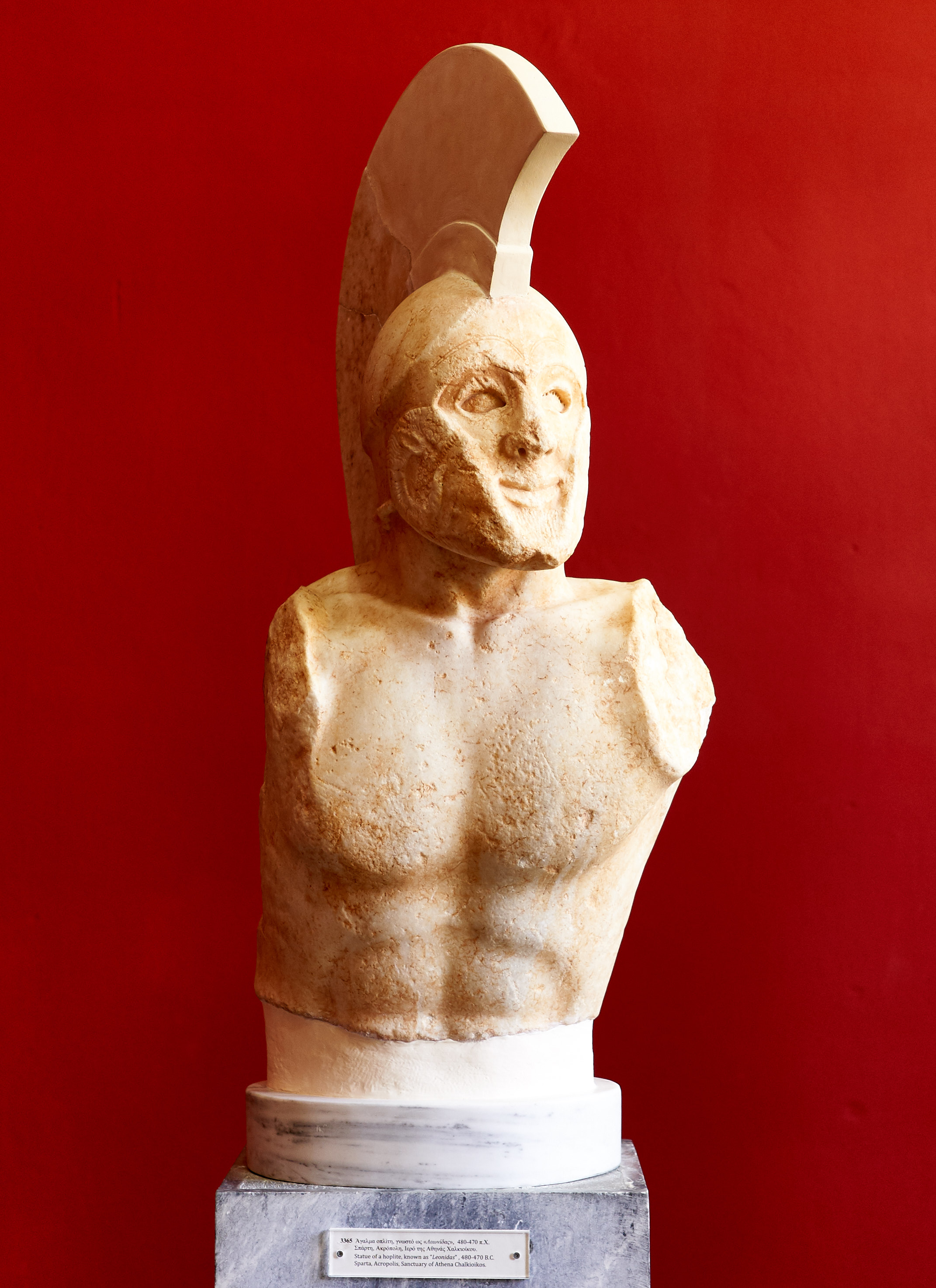
The so-called Leonidas statue from the museum's collection (5th BC)

The museum is one of Greece's oldest archaeology museums. Years after its opening, it was largely neglected with most of its pieces currently stored in warehouses.

In July 2020, the Greek Minister of Culture and Sports Lina Mendoni approved plans to construct a new Archaeological Museum of Sparta and renovate the existing museum. The initiative included significant funding and promotion from the Stavros Niarchos Foundation.

== Collections ==
In the museum are housed finds from excavations around the prefecture of Lakonia, provided that they are not exposed in collections of the archaeological museum Gythion or Neapolis.

- Room I: Stelae of Roman years.
- Room II: Finds from the shrine of Artemis Orthia.
- Room III: Monumental sculpture and portraiture of Roman era.
- Room IV: Prehistoric finds from the wider region of Lakonia.
- Room V: Samples of Roman mosaics.
- Room VI: Architectonic parts of Apollo temple in Amyclae, that constitute also the more major department of collection
- Room VII: Finds of Lakonian sculpture.
