= Hollow Elis =

District of Elis, Greece

Hollow Elis (also known as Koile-Elis, or Vale of Elis) was a district of Elis, Greece. The district occupied the basin of the Peneus River. The district extended as far as Cape Araxos.
