= Petros Avgerinos =

Petros Avgerinos (Greek: Πέτρος Αυγερινός) was a Greek politician.

== Biography ==
He was born in Pyrgos, Elis and was related to the Avgerinos family. He was mayor of Pyrgos a number of times between 1868 and 1889.

During his term as mayor, he created the public market, the Apollo Theatre, and organised work on the Pyrgos-Katakolo railway line. He also ran a philharmonic school.

Preceded by Sokratis Syllaidopoulos	Mayor of Pyrgos (1868–1889 for several terms)	Succeeded by Ioannis Krestenitis
