= HMS Leonidas =

Two ships of the Royal Navy have been named HMS Leonidas after Leonidas I, king of ancient Sparta.

- The first HMS Leonidas (1807), launched in 1807, built by John Pelham of Frindsbury was a 36-gun fifth-rate frigate, used as a powder hulk from 1872 and sold in 1894.
- The second HMS Leonidas (1913), launched in 1913, was a Laforey-class destroyer. She served with the 3rd Destroyer Flotilla and as a convoy escort in World War I and was broken up in 1922.
