= Christos Stefanopoulos =

Greek politician (c. 1853–1918)

Christos Stephanopoulos
- Χρήστος Στεφανόπουλος
- Born: c. 1853; Divri, Olympia, Elis, Greece
- Died: 1918; Greece
- Occupation: Politician
- Spouse: Fani Vakalopoulou
- Children: 2, including Stefanos Stefanopoulos and Georgios Stefanopoulos
- Relatives: Andreas Stefanopoulos (brother)

Christos Stefanopoulos (Greek: Χρήστος Στεφανόπουλος; c. 1853 – 1918), was a Greek politician, a member of Greek parliament for multiple terms, and the 6th mayor of Pyrgos.

Stefanopoulos was born c. 1853 in Divri (now part of Olympia municipality). He was the son of Stefanos Stefanopoulos the elder, a politician and member of the historic Stephanopoulos family. He studied law at Athens and was married to Fani Vakalopoulou. His sons were Stefanos Stefanopoulos, prime minister of Greece, and Georgios Stefanopoulos, member of parliament.

In the first years of his political career, he was mayor of Divri. He was elected representative for Elis in the Greek parliament in 1885, 1887, 1892, 1895, 1902, 1905 and 1906. In 1907, he was elected mayor of Pyrgos, a position he held until his death in 1918.

Preceded by Anastasios Varouxis	Mayor of Pyrgos; 1907-1918	Succeeded by Takis Vakalopoulos
