= Sisinis =

Sisinis (Greek: Σισίνης) is a surname. Notable people with the surname include:

- Chrysanthos Sisinis (died 1845), Greek revolutionary leader and politician
- Chrysanthos Sisinis (general) (c. 1857–?), Greek general
- Georgios Sisinis (1769–1831), Greek revolutionary leader and farmer
