= Saint Charalambos Church, Iași =

Heritage site in Iași County, Romania

Coordinates: 47.1713°N 27.5845°E

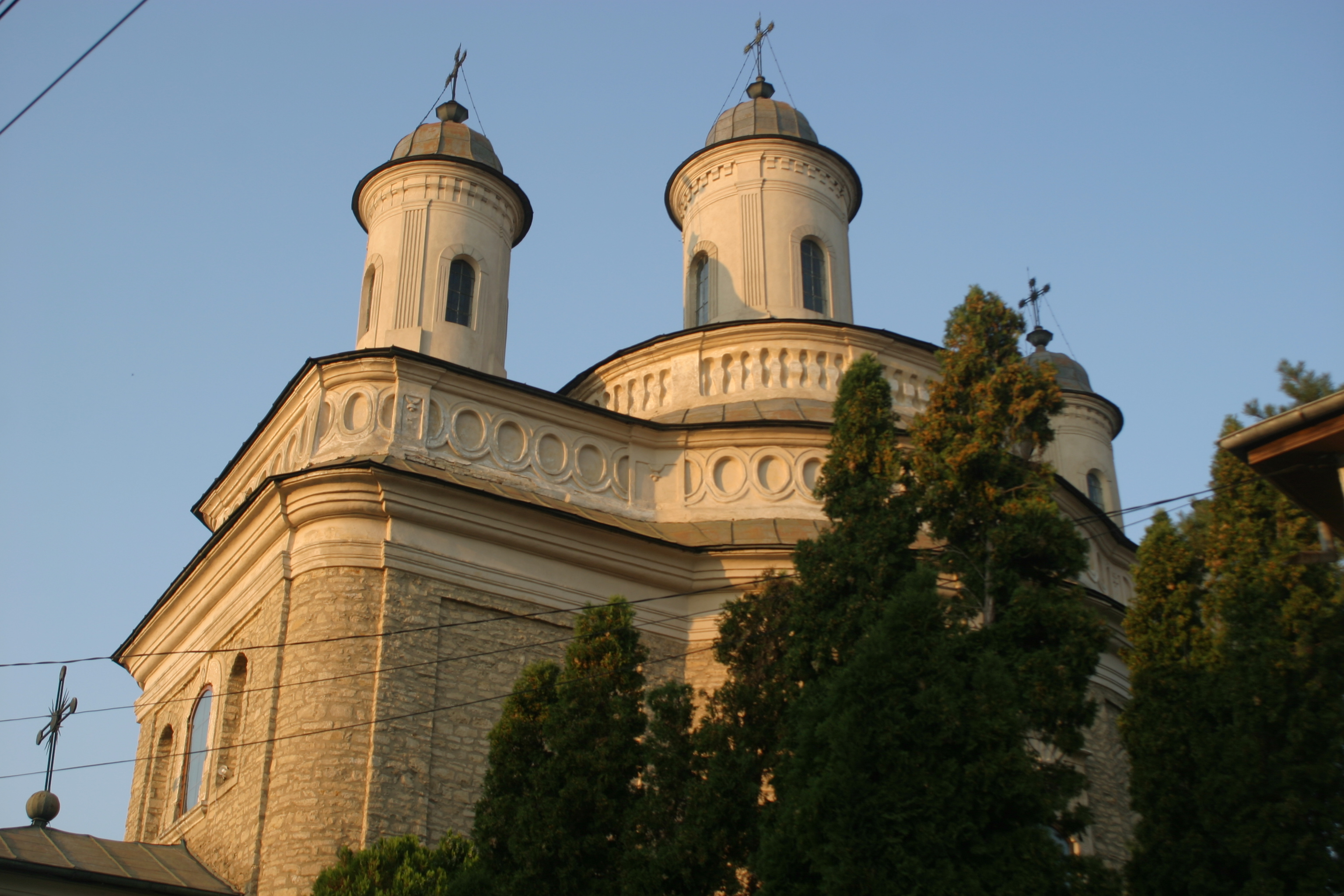
Saint Charalambos Church

Saint Charalambos Church (Romanian: Biserica Sfântul Haralambie) is a Romanian Orthodox church located at 4 Octav Botez Street in Iași, Romania. It is dedicated to Saint Charalambos.

According to a legend, repeated by Mihail Sadoveanu in Hanu Ancuței, there were two brothers from Epirus, Gheorghe and Haralambie Leondarie, who served as head messengers (ceauși) for Prince Constantine Ypsilantis at the end of the 18th century. After Haralambie became a hajduk, Ypsilantis ordered Gheorghe to capture the outlaw dead or alive, on pain of execution. The latter went on pursuit with fifty troops. While attempting to capture his brother near Văratec Monastery, Gheorghe accidentally killed him. He gave Haralambie's head to the prince, quit the service and, in order to obtain forgiveness, built the church on a plot of land granted by Ypsilantis. Begun in 1799, it was consecrated in 1804. The structure had three spires; the interior painting was done around 1900. The bell tower preserves one bell donated by the ktitor in 1804 and others from the parishioners. In the early 19th century, the church belonged to the guild of mercenaries in the prince's guard and to firearms makers. For a time, the church served Old Believers driven out of Russia.

There was a graveyard outside the church; part of the remains were disinterred after Eternitatea cemetery was established in 1871, an exception being Gheorghe Leondari, who was buried there after his death in 1835. A hundred years later, his remains were placed in the church, on the right side of the nave. Also in 1935, the church was blessed a second time by Metropolitan Nicodim Munteanu. An athenaeum associated with the church was built in the yard in 1934. This hosted cultural figures, among the most popular speakers being philosopher Ion Petrovici. It was destroyed during World War II. After the 1977 Vrancea earthquake, the damaged spires were rebuilt in 1997-1998 and the interior repainted in 1987-1989. During the same period, the Miclăușeni Monastery donated part of Saint Charalambos' relics to the parish. Following the Romanian Revolution, a bakery and food pantry were established at the church.

The church is listed as a historic monument by Romania's Ministry of Culture and Religious Affairs.

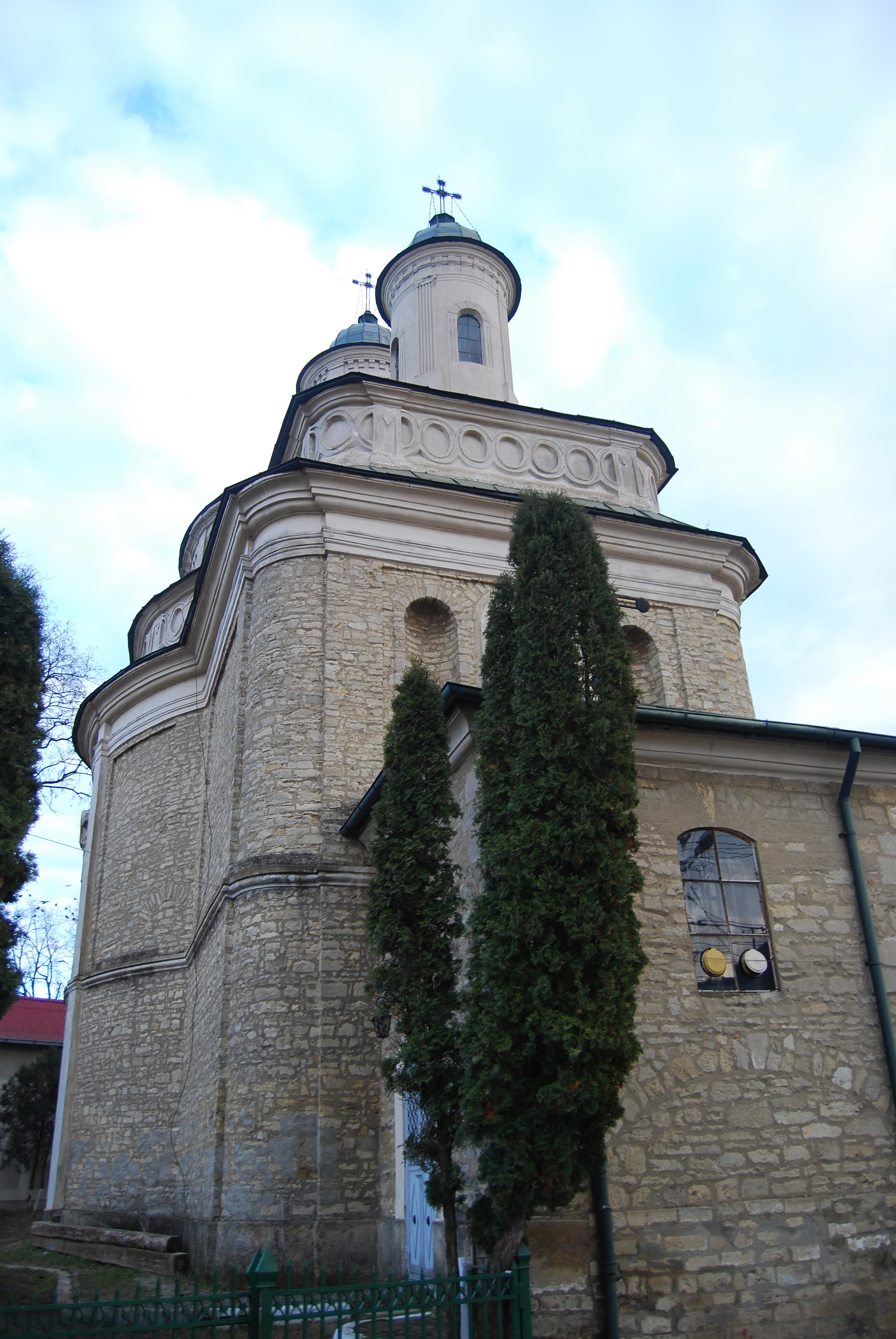
Another view

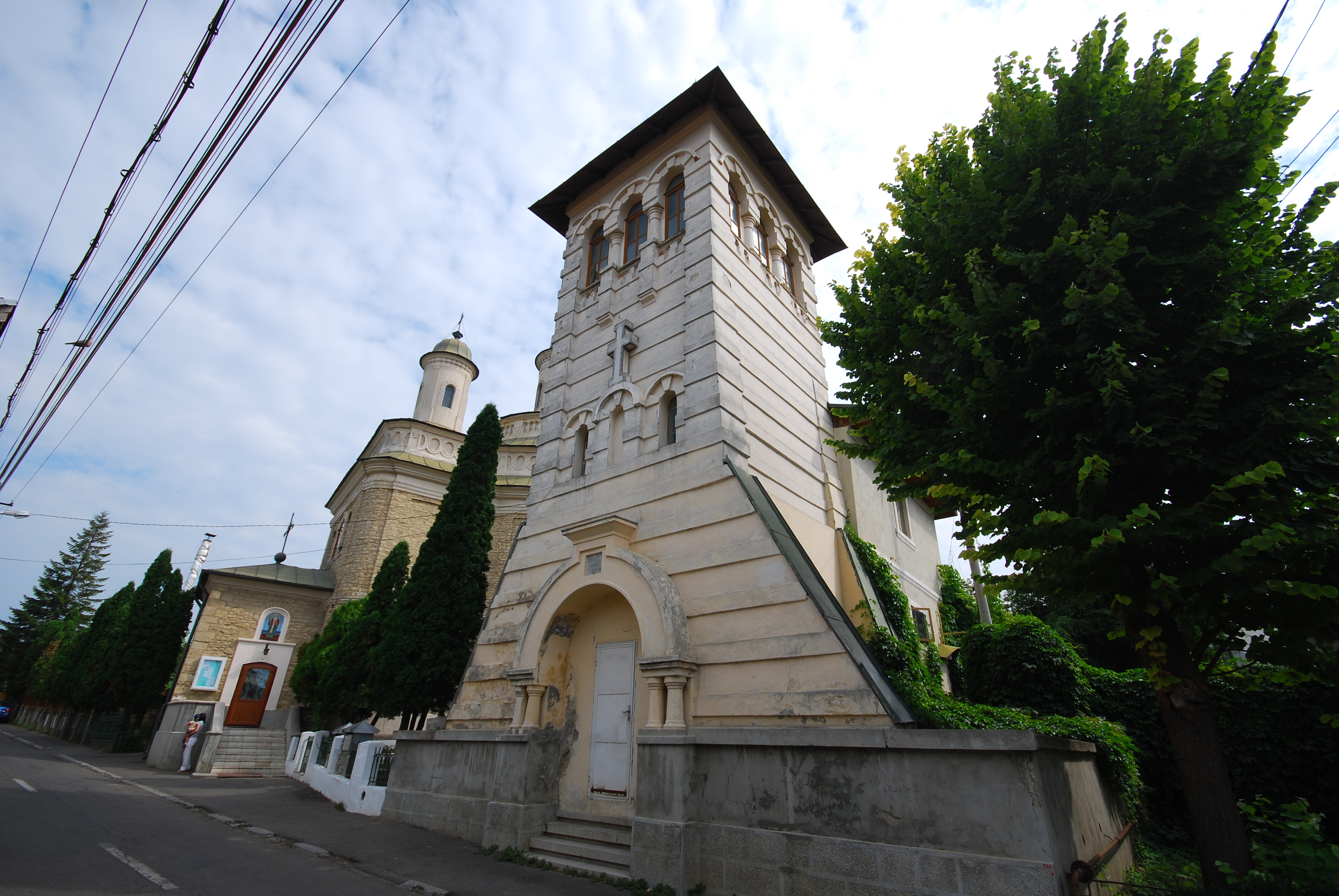
Bell tower

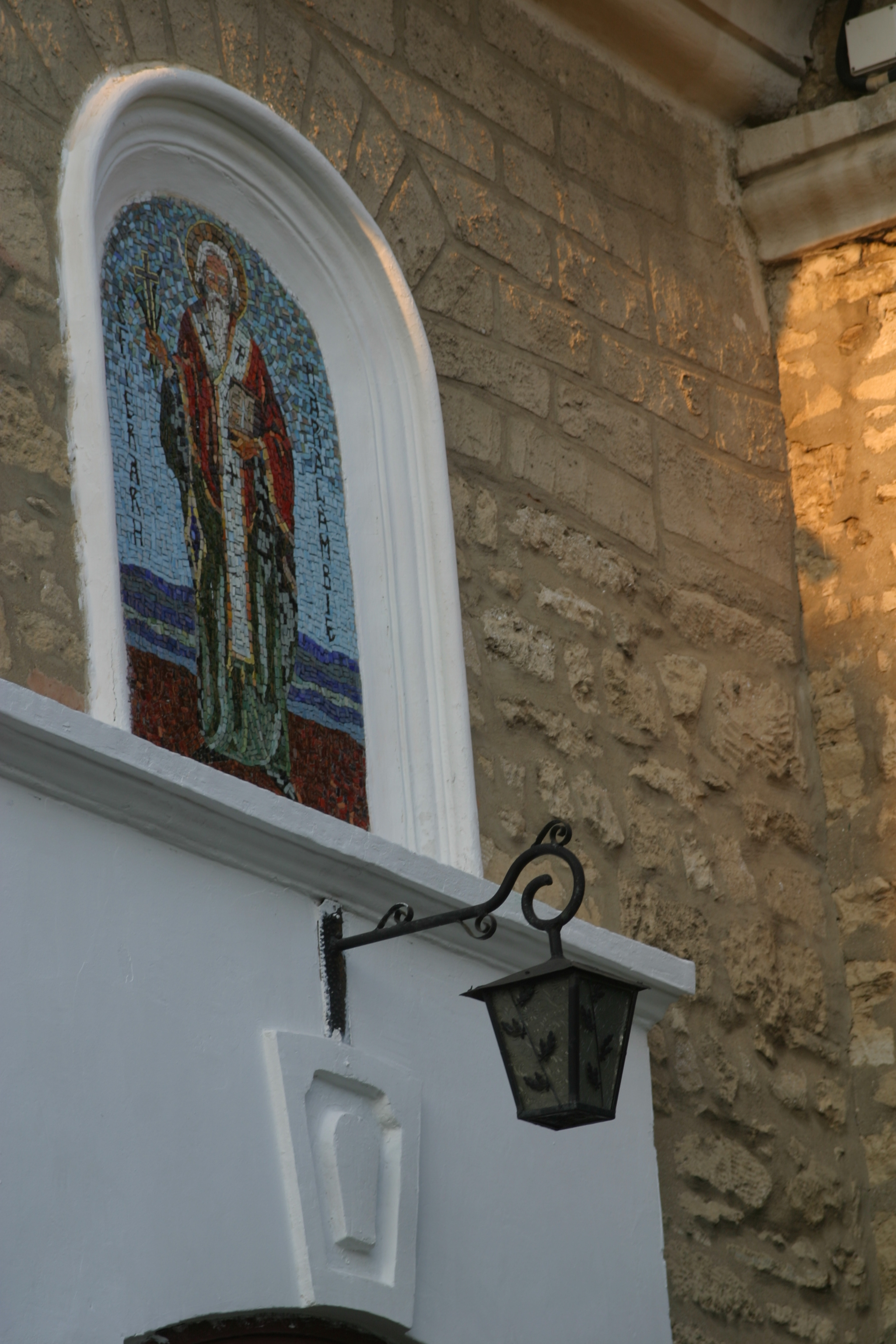
Detail

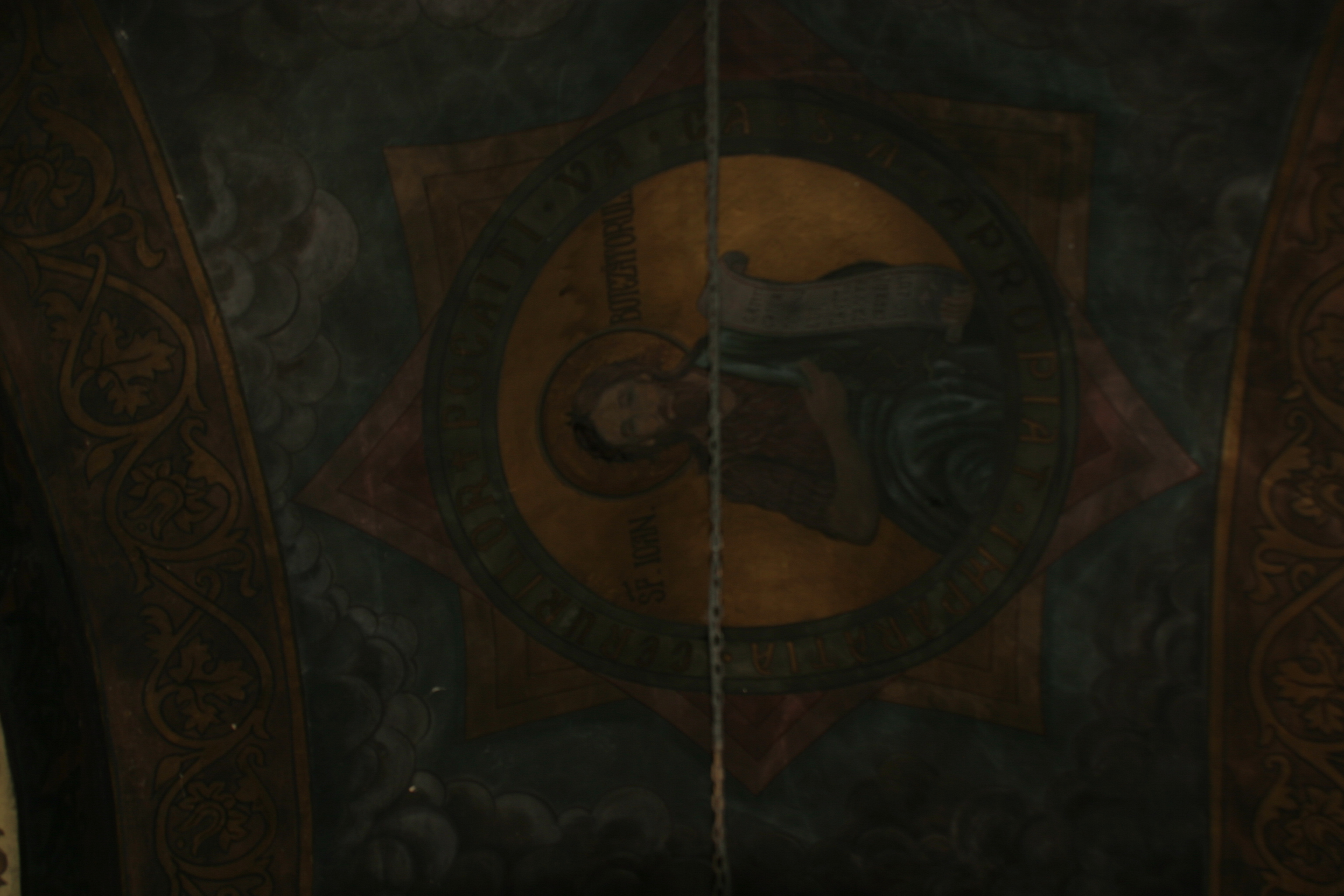
Ceiling
