= Nikolaos Vilaetis =

Greek politician and chief of Pyrgos

- Νικόλαος Βιλαέτης

Representative of Ilia at the First National Council
- Incumbent
- Assumed office December 1821

Personal details
- Born: c. 1835
- Died: 1860
- Relatives: Yiannis Vilaetis (cousin); Haralambos Vilaetis (brother)
- Occupation: Chief of Pyrgos; politician

Nikolaos Vilaetis (Greek: Νικόλαος Βιλαέτης, c. 1835–1860) was a chief of Pyrgos and a Greek politician. He descended from a famous family of Pyrgos in which he was one of the first who inhabited the area. He was the cousin of Yiannis and brother of Haralambos. He was the chief of Pyrgos and was elected as an attorney of Ilia in the First National Council, in December 1821, months after the start of the Greek War of Independence, he later entered politics.
