= Charalampos Christopoulos =

Greek politician

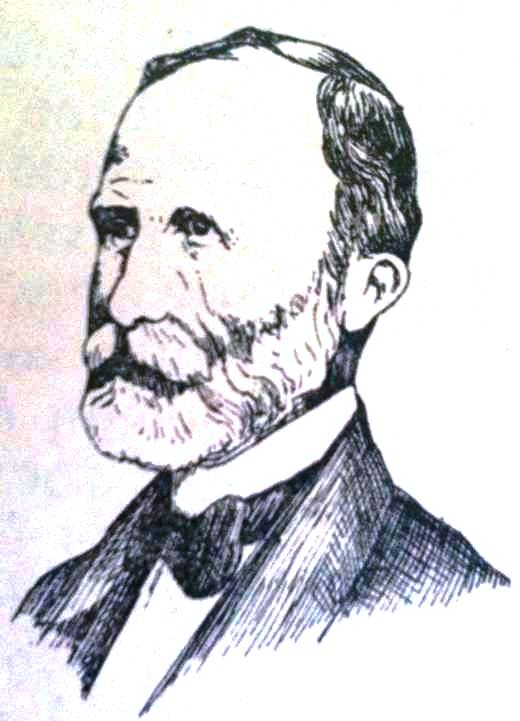
Charalambos Christopoulos

Charalampos Christopoulos (Greek: Χαράλαμπος Χριστόπουλος; Andritsaina, possibly 1809 – Athens, 8 April 1871) was a Greek 19th-century politician, MP and six times minister during the 1855–1870 period.

== Sources ==
- Charalampos Christopoulos biographical information from the Institute of Modern Greek Studies
- Vretos, Marinos (1866). National calendar. Athens: Παρά τω Κ. Δραγούμη εκδότη της Πανδώρας. Archived from the original on 2008-04-14.
- Λήμμα Χριστόπουλος Χαράλαμπος, Εγκυκλοπαιδικό Λεξικό Ελευθερουδάκη, Athens, 1931
- Kostis Ailianos, Charalampos Chr. Christopoulos, minister of foreign affairs, three days, four months... 1865, 1870–1871, Nea Estia, year 88, volume 176, issue 1863, Sept. 2014, p. 121–144
- Antonis Makrydimitris, The foreign ministers of Greece 1829–2000, Kastaniotis publications, Athens, 2000, p. 57
