= Leonida Pallotta =

Italian footballer

Personal information
- Full name: Leonida Mario Pallotta
- Date of birth: September 25, 1910
- Place of birth: Rome, Italy
- Position: Goalkeeper

Senior career*
Years	Team	Apps	(Gls)
1930–1932	Roma	2	(0)
1932–1933	Roma (B team)		
1933–1934	Cagliari	11	(0)
- * Club domestic league appearances and goals

Leonida Mario Pallotta (born September 25, 1910, in Rome) was an Italian professional footballer who played as a goalkeeper.

He played 2 games in the 1930/31 season in the Serie A for A.S. Roma.
