= Andritsaina =

Andritsaina Ανδρίτσαινα
- Municipal unit
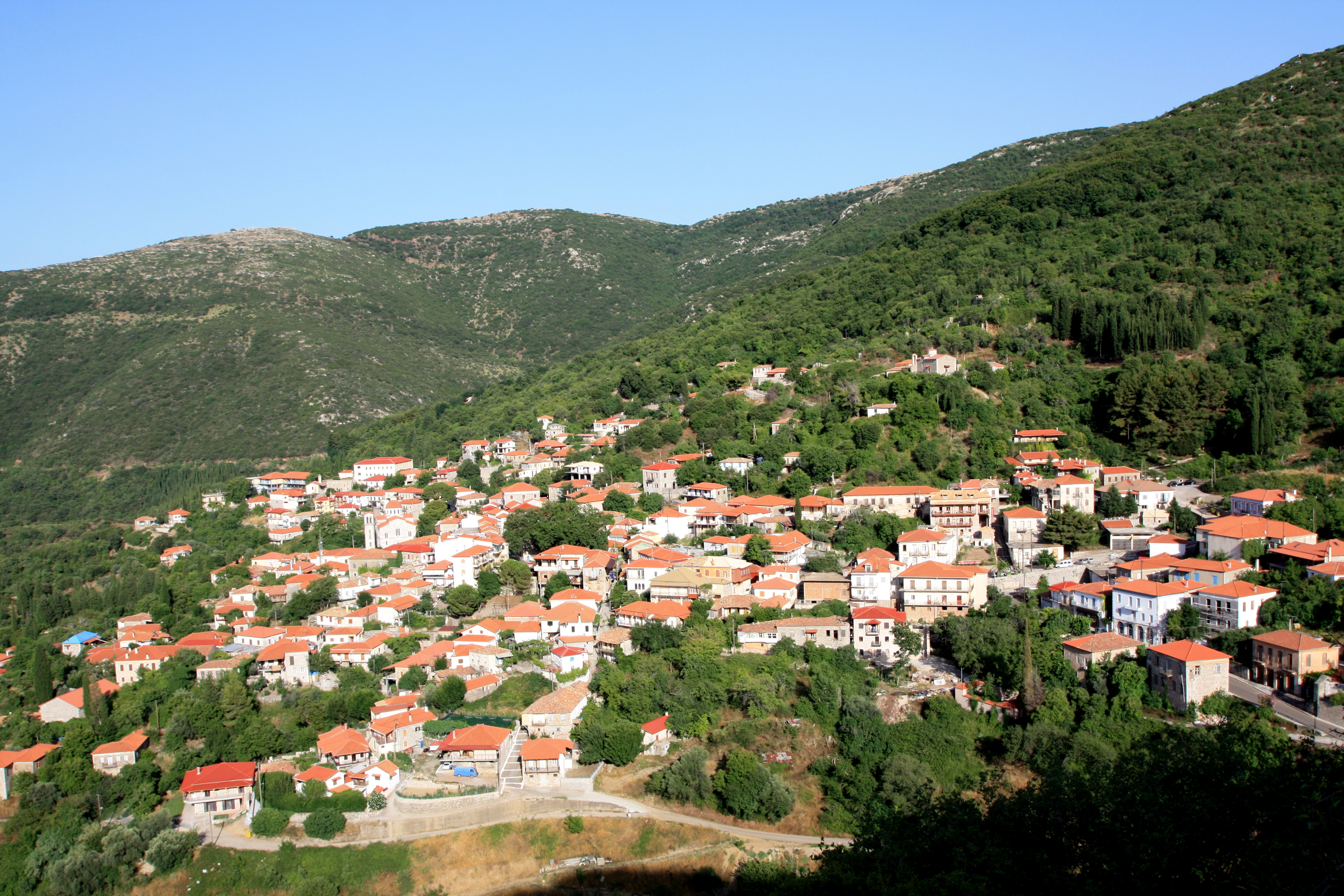

- Location within the regional unit

- Location within Greece
- Coordinates: 37°29′N 21°54.3′E
- Country: Greece
- Administrative region: West Greece
- Regional unit: Elis
- Municipality: Andritsaina-Krestena

Area
  - Municipal unit: 131.2 km^{2} (50.7 sq mi)
- Elevation: 705 m (2,313 ft)

Population (2021)
  - Municipal unit: 1,158
  - Municipal unit density: 8.826/km^{2} (22.86/sq mi)
  - Community: 353
- Time zone: UTC+2 (EET)
  - Summer (DST): UTC+3 (EEST)
- Postal code: 270 61
- Area code: 26260
- Vehicle registration: ΗΑ

Andritsaina (Greek: Ανδρίτσαινα) is a village, a community and a former municipality in Elis, West Greece, Greece. Since the 2011 local government reform it is part of the municipality Andritsaina-Krestena, of which it is a municipal unit. The municipal unit has an area of 131.247 km^{2}.

== Geography ==
Andritsaina is situated in mountainous southeastern Elis, on the borders with Arcadia and Messenia. The town is built on a hillside, northwest of mount Lykaion. The river Alfeios forms the northeastern border of the municipal unit. The predominant land uses in the municipal unit are forestry and small scale farming. Andritsaina is 22 km northwest of Megalopoli, 28 km southeast of Krestena, 41 km west of Tripoli and 46 km southeast of Pyrgos. The Greek National Road 76 (Krestena - Karytaina - Megalopoli) runs through Andritsaina.

== History ==
According to tradition, Andritsaina owes its name to the wife of a Cretan shepherd named Andrikos, who -chasing his runaway sheep- came to a spring on mount Lykaion. There he built an inn that after his death was kept by his wife Andrikaina (meaning "the wife of Andrikos"). From her name and from the local pronunciation of "kai" as "tsai", the inn was named "the hostel of Andritsaina". When houses were built in the surrounding area, the settlement was named "Andritsaina".

Ruins north of the village were mentioned by early explorers (Ludwig Ross and Ernst Curtius) and falsely associated with the ancient place name Theisoa, but have not been found or documented since.

The area was part of ancient Arcadia. Andritsaina flourished during the Frankish rule (13th-14th centuries AD) and is mentioned in the Chronicle of the Morea. The village played a crucial role during the Orlov Revolt and the Greek War of Independence. In 1826, Andritsaina was destroyed by Ibrahim Pasha's troops.

== Sights ==
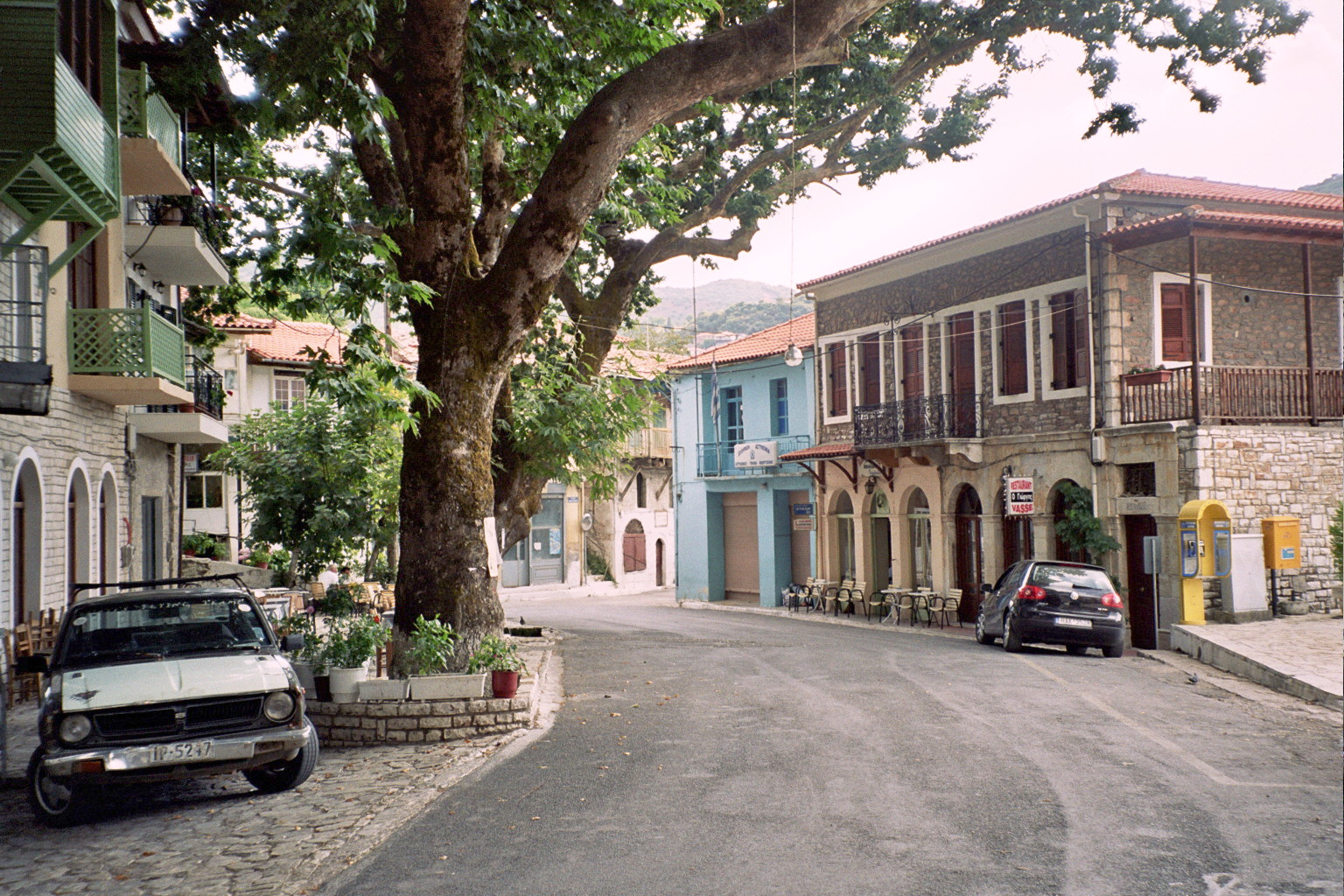
Street

Today, the village has impressive old mansions, cobblestone streets, a square surrounded by tall trees and magnificent views. The fountain in the square (I Trani Vrysi) is the Peloponnese's oldest fountain, built in 1724. The famous Nikolopouleios library was founded in 1840 from donations of the humanist Agathofron Nikolopoulos, whose family came from Andritsaina. Its collection comprises rare 16th- and 17th-century manuscripts, in Greek and in foreign languages, important documents from the period of the Greek War of Independence and rich folklore material. Today, the library has more than 40,000 volumes. The famous Temple of Epicurian Apollo at Bassae is 6 km south of Andritsaina, in Messenia.

== Subdivisions ==
The municipal unit Andritsaina is subdivided into the following communities (constituent villages in brackets):

- Andritsaina (Andritsaina, Karmio, Myloi, Sykies)
- Dafnoula (Dafnoula, Chelidoni)
- Dragogio (Dragogio, Kastrougkaina, Plateia)
- Fanari
- Koufopoulo
- Linistaina
- Matesi
- Rovia
- Sekoulas (Sekoulas, Balaiika)
- Theisoa

The community Andritsaina consists of the main village Andritsaina and the small mountain villages Karmio (3 km to the northeast), Myloi (4 km to the northwest) and Sykies (5 km to the north).

== Population ==
Year	Village	Community	Municipal unit
1981	-	1,034	-
1991	660	-	2,511
2001	575	663	2,152
2011	795	856	1,798
2021	296	353	1,158

== People ==
- Panagiotis Anagnostopoulos, revolutionary leader
- Anastasios Christopoulos, revolutionary leader
- Athanasios Kanellopoulos, politician
- Dimitrios Kiousopoulos, jurist and politician
- Konstantinos Nikolopoulos, composer, archeologist, and philologist

== See also ==
- List of settlements in Elis
