= Thallis Theodoridis =

Thallis Theodoritis Θαλλής Θεοδωρίδης
- Born: around 1790; Pyrgos, (now Greece)
- Died: 1850; Greece
- Occupation: Greek revolutionary leader

Thallis Theodoridis (Greek: Θαλλής Θεοδωρίδης, died 1850) was a Greek revolutionary leader during the Greek War of Independence.

He was born in Pyrgos and is the descendant of the rich Theodoridis family which descended from Divri (now Lampeia). He was the secretary and aide of the Sissinaians and fought with his own army in Attica, Ilia, and the battle of Riolos. After the revolution, he was the stockkeeper of Pyrgos, but was accused several times for embezzlement. He died in 1850.

His grandson was Vasileios Theodoridis.
