= Zaimis =

Greek family

The Zaimis family (Greek: Ζαΐμης) is an old family of politicians from Kalavryta, whose members played a leading role during the period of Ottoman Greece and the Greek War of Independence, subsequently playing an important role in the political life of the new Greek state.

== Notable people ==
- Dimitrios Zaimis (b. 18th century), Greek freedom fighter and politician from Achaea.
- Asimakis Zaimis, Greek freedom fighter, politician and filikos
- Andreas Zaimis (1791–1840), Greek freedom fighter and politician
- Ioannis Zaimis (1797–1882), Greek politician, first Mayor of Patras
- Thrasyvoulos Zaimis (1822–1880), Prime Minister of Greece two times between 1869 and 1872
- Alexandros Zaimis (1855–1936), Prime Minister of Greece six times between 1897 and 1928

== Sources ==
- Παπανδρέου, Γεώργιος (1906). Kalavrytine Yearbook: a treatise on the historical province of Kalavryta. Athens: Michail I. Saliveros. p. 113.
- Michail V. Sakellariou, The Peloponnese during the Second Turkish Occupation (1715–1821), Athens 1939, reissued 2000.
