= Charalambos Dimarchopoulos =

Greek politician

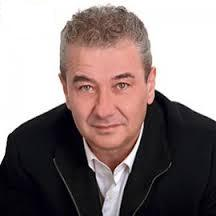
Mr. Dimarchopoulos in 2014.

Charalambos Dimarchopoulos (Greek: Χαραλαμπος Δημαρχοπουλος) was born in Xanthi, Greece in 1964. He graduated the Faculty of Education of the Aristotle University of Thessaloniki. Since 1985, he served as a primary school teacher in many schools and, until the May 2014 elections, he held the position of the principal of the primary school of Stavroupoli, Xanthi.

In 2007, he was elected as a member of the Prefectural Council of Xanthi with the local political formation of Giorgos Pavlidis, prefect at the time. From 2009 to 2010, he served as vice-Prefect of Xanthi Prefecture. In the local elections of 2010, he ran and was elected as a member of the municipal council of Xanthi, which he chaired from 2-1-2011 – and again from his re-election as chairman of the municipal council from January 2013.

In local elections of May 2014, he headed the local political formation "Δήμος Πρότυπο" ("A model municipality"), with which he was elected mayor in the second round of the elections on 25-5-2014, gathering 11,608 votes, 51.14%, versus 11,090 votes, 48.86%, for his opponent Christos Poulios. According to the law of Kallikratis reform in effect since the 2014 elections, he became mayor on September 1, 2014 for a term of 5 years; until 2014 the term, of four year, began on the January 1 after the elections.

He is married and has one daughter born in 2002.
