= Vasileios Theodoridis =

Greek journalist and anarchist

Vasileios Theodoridis (Greek: Βασίλειος Θεοδωρίδης) was a Greek journalist and anarchist.

Theodoridis was born in Pyrgos and studied law in Athens. He was descended from the famous Theodoridis family and was the son of Aristomenis Theodoridis, manager of Stafidikis bank, and grandson of Thallis Theodoridis. He was one of the founding members of the Anarchist Association of Pyrgos, a group that tried to associate the Christian religion with social justice. The group controlled the weekly paper Neon Fos, with Theodoridis being its editor. The paper, which was founded in 1898, stopped running in 1899. Theodoridis continued contributing to the local press and Athens-based newspapers, including Kathimerini.
