= Paraskevas Avgerinos =

Greek politician

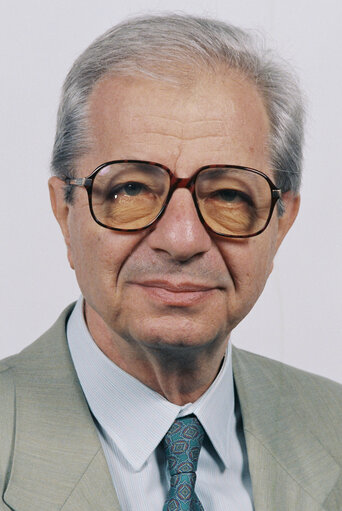

Member of the European Parliament
- In office 24 July 1984 – 19 July 1999
- Constituency: Greece

Personal details
- Born: 19 August 1927 (age 98) Alonistaina, Arcadia, Second Hellenic Republic
- Party: Panhellenic Socialist Movement
- Occupation: Politician

Paraskevas Avgerinos is a Greek politician, who, from 1984 until 1999, was a Member of the European Parliament (MEP), representing Greece for the Panhellenic Socialist Movement.

== Parliamentary service ==
- Chair, Delegation for relations with Yugoslavia (1989–1992)
- Chair, Delegation for relations with the Republics of Yugoslavia (1992–1993)
- Chair, Delegation for relations with the Republics of former Yugoslavia (1993–1994)
- Vice-Chair, Delegation for relations with Cyprus (1985–1987)
- Vice Chair, Committee on Regional Policy and Regional Planning (1987–1989)
