= Anastasios Christopoulos =

Greek revolutionary leader

Anastasios Christopoulos Αναστάσιος Χριστόπουλος
- Born: 1805; Andritsaina, (now Greece)
- Died: March 22, 1854 (aged 48–49); Athens, Greece
- Occupation: Greek revolutionary leader

Anastasios Christopoulos (Greek: Αναστάσιος Χριστόπουλος; 1805 – 1854) was a lawyer and a Greek revolutionary leader of the Greek War of Independence.

== Biography ==
Christopoulos was born in Andritsaina, the son of Christos Christopoulos. He is considered the patriarch of the renowned Christopoulos family, whose members became actively involved in Greek politics. Christopoulos studied law and philosophy in Constantinople (now Istanbul), as well as in Pisa, and resided in Bucharest for several years. At the beginning of the Greek Revolution, he joined the Sacred Band, but was later captured. After his release, he moved to Iaşi, where he remained until 1828. He later returned to the newly established independent Greek State.

In Greece, he worked as a judge at the islands of Andros, Spetses, Kea and Aigina. Subsequently, he headed to Athens where he became a first instance court judge, a judge in the court of appeals and a first instance court president. He also wrote a Greek language grammar textbook.

He died in 1854. He was the brother of Tzannetos Christopoulos, a commander-in-chief of the Greek Revolution.
