= Agamemnon Avgerinos =

Greek politician

Dimitrios Avgerinos Αγαμέμνων Αυγερινός
- Born: Pyrgos, Ottoman Empire
- Died: 1865
- Occupation: writer

Agamemnon Avgerinos (Greek: Αγαμέμνων Αυγερινός) was a Greek politician and leader of the Greek War of Independence of 1821.

He was born in Pyrgos, the son of Georgios Avgerinos, a descendant of the Pyrgiotiki family. He studied for a doctorate in Italy and was elected a member in Pyrgos. He ministered as chief doctor during the revolution and was leader of weaponry with Andreas Londos and Theodoros Kolokotronis. During the revolution, he was a representative of Elis in the second and the third national assembly. He was foreign minister during the government of Zinovios Valvis in 1863. Between 1858 and 1859, he was Speaker of the Hellenic Parliament.

He died in 1865.
