= Leonida Lucchetta =

Italian footballer

Personal information
- Date of birth: 28 August 1911
- Place of birth: Milan, Italy
- Position: Midfielder

Senior career*
Years	Team	Apps	(Gls)
1930–1932	Ambrosiana-Inter	1	(0)
1932–1933	Palermo	0	(0)
1933–1938	Alfa Romeo Milano		
- * Club domestic league appearances and goals

Leonida Lucchetta (born 28 August 1911, date of death unknown) was an Italian professional football player.

== Career ==
In the 1931–1932 season, he played one Serie A match wearing the Ambrosiana-Inter shirt, specifically on 20 September 1931, away against Casale.

In the 1932–1933 season, he played again in Serie A with the newly promoted Palermo.

From 1936 to 1938 he played for Alfa Romeo; he then played for A.S. Romana of Milan, and then again for Alfa Romeo, until 1942.
