= Leonidas Varouxis =

Greek journalist and politician

Leonidas Varouxis (Greek: Λεωνίδας Βαρουξής) was a Greek journalist, publisher and a politician. His family had familial ties with the Spilotopoulos family from Dimitsana, which participated in the Greek War of Independence of 1821.

Varouxis was born in Pyrgos,Elis and was descended from a family of journalists. In 1892, edited the weekly paper Avgi. He was a brother of Konstantinos Varouxis and was employed as a journalist at the newspaper Akropolis in the capital city of Athens. He founded the first daily newspaper in Pyrgos Patris in 1902. He was counseled in the spiritual regeneration of his topic. He was educated as a journalist and a publisher of Gavriilidis of Akropolis. In 1917, he wrote about the voting of the electorate area of Ilia, an area in which he conjectured that he knew in 1929, along with the sources which drew up from Ilia's newspapers. He ceased publication in and the newspaper was later revived by his nephew in 1955.

Varouxis died in 1951.
