= Ioannis Liourdis =

Greek politician

Ioannis Liourdis Ιωάννης Λιούρδης
- Born: around 1800; Pyrgos, now Greece
- Died: 1899; Greece
- Occupation: politician

Ioannis Liourdis (Greek: Ιωάννης Λιούρδης, ca. 1800 in Pyrgos - 1899) was a Greek politician.

He was born in Pyrgos around 1800 and descended from an old family of Pyrgos which had Frankish roots. He was politician and lived in Athens. He participated in the large farmers' protests against taxes in 1894. The city of Pyrgos honoured him by naming a street after him. He died in 1899 and is buried in the First Cemetery of Athens.
