= Leonidas (sculpture) =

Sculpture from the Acropolis of Sparta

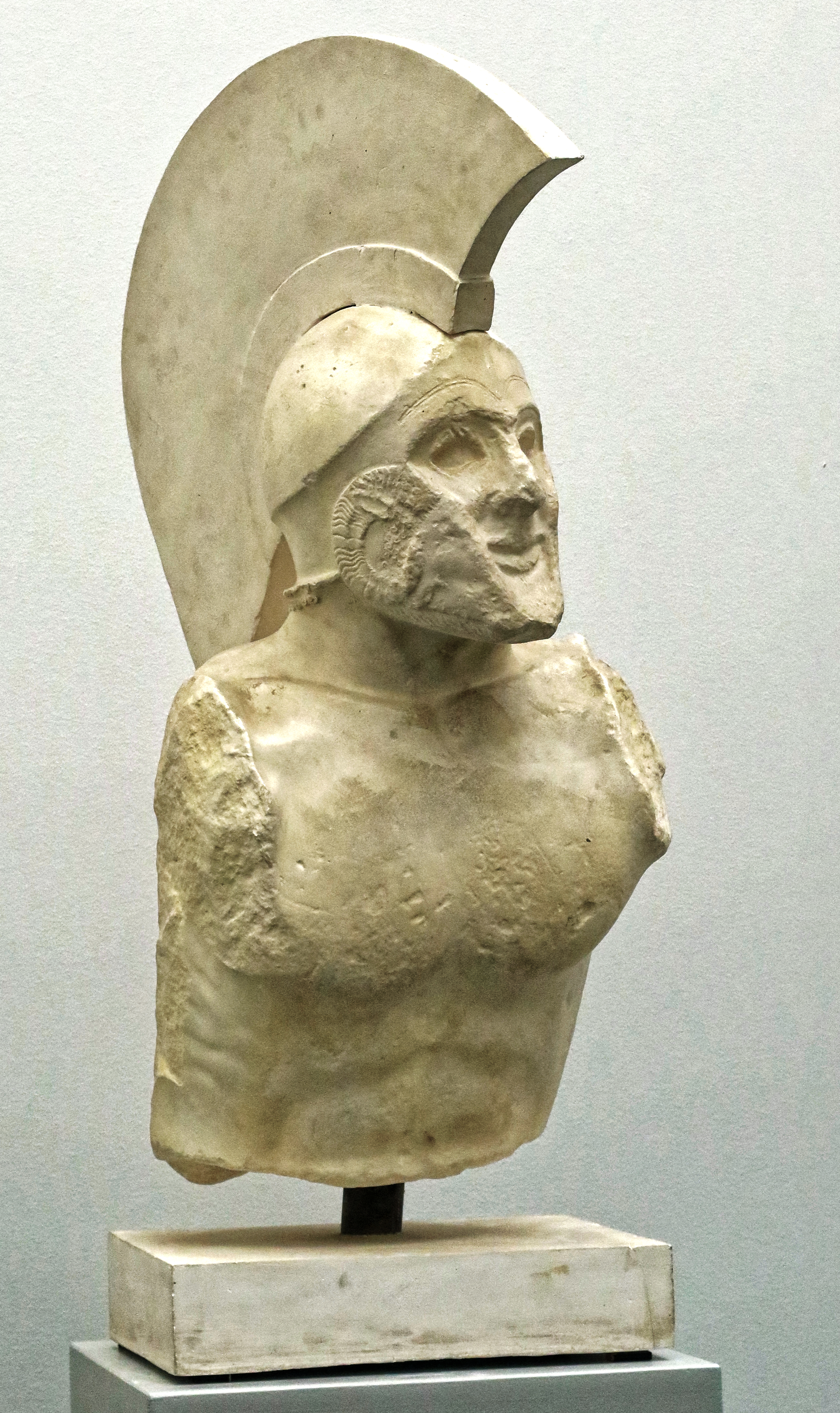
- Artist: unknown
- Year: 480–470 BC
- Medium: Parian marble
- Dimensions: 78 cm (31 in)
- Location: Archaeological Museum of Sparta

Leonidas is a sculpture of a hoplite made of Parian marble in 480–470 BC and unearthed in 1925. The excavation team named it "Leonidas", deducing that it depicts the Spartan king Leonidas I. It was found southwest of peribolos of the Athena Chalkioikos on the Acropolis of Sparta. The sculpture is housed in the Archaeological Museum of Sparta, which acquired it from the British School at Athens in 1926. The sculpture features a Corinthian helmet with ram-shaped cheek pieces. While most of the plume is a restoration, fragments of a leg, foot, shield and helmet were also found nearby.

The sculpture was part of a group, probably affixed to the sanctuary pediment. According to several scholars, it formed part of the memorial on the Spartan acropolis to honor Leonidas on his reburial. Paul Cartledge, however, argued it would have represented a mythical hero or a god rather than the historical person of Leonidas. One estimation dates the sculpture before rather than after 480 BC, the year of the Battle of Thermopylae where Leonidas died.

== Influence ==
=== Statue of Leonidas at Thermopylae ===
In 1955, a bronze statue of king Leonidas was erected as part of a monument in Thermopylae. Its sculptor Vasos Falireas modeled it after the 'Leonidas' torso excavated in 1925. Sponsored by a group of Greek Americans, the planned site was in the modern city of Sparta, but the project was met by objection there because the statue was naked. The monument finally settled at Thermopylae.

=== Statue of Leonidas at Sparta ===
In 1969, another bronze statue of king Leonidas, again made by Vasos Falireas, was erected in downtown Sparta. It was designed in 1966, the inscription dated 1968, installed in 1969 and an unveiling ceremony was held in 1970. This time it was clothed. Its design and pose differs from the monument in Thermopylae, but Paul Cartledge describes both statues as based on "the exact same model", the excavated 'Leonidas' torso.
