= Lykourgos Krestenitis =

Greek politician (1793–1873)

Lykourgos Krestenitis Λυκούργος Κρεστενίτης
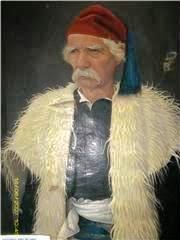
- Born: 1793; Pyrgos, Ottoman Empire
- Died: 1873 (aged 79–80); Pyrgos, Greece
- Occupation: politician

Lykourgos Krestenitis (Greek: Λυκούργος Κρεστενίτης, 1793–1873) was a Greek politician during the early decades of the modern Greek state.

Krestenitis was born in Pyrgos in Elis in 1793, to Ioannis Krestenitis. He studied in Zante and later at the Ionian Academy. He entered the Filiki Eteria and upon the outbreak of the Greek Revolution, he was elected representative of his province to the National Assembly. In 1825, during the civil war, his political differences with Theodoros Kolokotronis and Dimitrios Plapoutas forced him to leave his home, which was subsequently razed by Kolokotronis' troops. In the same year, he was condemned to three years imprisonment for forgery. Throughout his political career, his name would continue to be implicated in several scandals.

Following Independence, in 1843 he was appointed prefect of the province of Kynaithi. In his later career, he became minister of Justice (1865), and Interior, Finances and Foreign Affairs (1860). In 1866–1867 he served as president of the Greek Parliament. He died in 1873.
