= Charalambos Avgerinos =

Greek politician

Charalmbos Avgerinos (Greek: Χαράλαμπος Αυγερινός, March 13, 1866 – July 27, 1942) was a Greek politician. He was the father of Nakis Avgerinos. He ran for mayor of Pyrgos. He preceded by Christos Stefanopoulos and was later succeeded by Takis Vakalopoulos.

Preceded by Christos Stefanopoulos	Mayor of Pyrgos (around the 20th century)	Succeeded by Takis Vakalopoulos
