= Konstantinos Varouxis =

Konstantinos Varouxis (Greek: Κωνσταντίνος Βαρουξής) was a Greek journalist and publisher.

Varouxis was born in Pyrgos and was descended from a family of journalists. The family had familial ties with the Spilotopoulos family from Dimitsana, which participated the Greek War of Independence of 1821. In 1892, he ran the weekly paper Avgi. Varouxis was exiled in Lefkada in 1895. He stood trial on the island and was found innocent. In the same year he ceased publishing Avgis and from 1910 started to publish the Ileia newspaper. That ended in 1915. He stopped writing entirely in 1931.
