= Avgerinos =

Village in Western Macedonia, Greece

Avgerinos Αυγερινός
- Community
- Main square of Avgerinos

- Location within Greece
- Coordinates: 40°14′23″N 21°09′45″E
- Country: Greece
- Administrative region: Western Macedonia
- Regional unit: Kozani
- Municipality: Voio
- Municipal unit: Tsotyli
- Elevation: 1,050 m (3,440 ft)

Population (2021)
  - Community: 138
- Time zone: UTC+2 (EET)
  - Summer (DST): UTC+3 (EEST)

Avgerinos (Greek: Αυγερινός; formerly Kostantsikon (Κωνστάντσικον)) is a mountain village and community in the Tsotyli municipal unit of Voio, Kozani regional unit, Western Macedonia, Greece. It lies at an elevation of approximately 1,050 m (3,440 ft) and had a permanent population of 138 in the 2021 census. Avgerinos is traditionally included among the mastorochoria, villages associated with builders and stonemasons, and the kastanochoria, or chestnut-growing villages, of the Voio area.

A settlement identified with Avgerinos appears in an Ottoman tax register of 1530. The village later developed traditions of education, itinerant stoneworking and emigration; its cultural heritage includes a nineteenth-century church, a folklore museum and local musical traditions.

== Geography ==
Avgerinos lies in the foothills of Voio, on the eastern side of the northern Pindus range. The village is surrounded by chestnut forests, with the Profitis Ilias mountain mass behind it, and overlooks the Aliakmon valley and Askio. It has four traditional quarters, or mahalades: Epano, Kato, Katidiko and Gyftomachalas.

== History ==
Historian Georgios Tsotsos identifies present-day Avgerinos with the settlement recorded as Kostanicko in an Ottoman tax register of 1530, which listed 87 households. A regional heritage guide hosted by the University of Western Macedonia describes the settlement at its present site as small in the late 17th century and states that it expanded in the early 18th century as inhabitants of nearby settlements moved there.

Historically, local livelihoods included livestock raising, forestry, trade and masonry. Cheesemaking was also practiced, including the production of batzos cheese.

A 2013 article in the Greek-American publication Cosmos Philly reports that emigrants from Avgerinos settled in Constantinople during the 19th century, where they worked as merchants and builders. According to the article, they established the Society of Avgerinos Agia Paraskevi to support infrastructure, schools and churches in the village. It also reports that emigrants in Brockton, Massachusetts, and Manchester, New Hampshire, formed an association under the same name in 1909, and that later communities in Philadelphia and Atlantic City helped finance the village community centre in 1988.

In 1918, Kostantsikon became the seat of the community of the same name. The settlement was officially renamed Avgerinos in 1927. During the Axis occupation of Greece, historian Vaios Kalogrias records that the Greek People's Liberation Army (ELAS) arrested several non-communist officers in Avgerinos in 1943. According to Kalogrias, they were later brought before partisan courts in Vouhorina and executed in mid-April.

In 1997, Avgerinos was incorporated into the municipality of Tsotyli. Following the 2010 Kallikratis reform, it became part of the municipality of Voio.

== Population ==
The permanent population recorded by the Hellenic Statistical Authority in recent censuses was:

| Census year | Permanent population |
|---|---|
| 2001 | 260 |
| 2011 | 236 |
| 2021 | 138 |

== Education and benefaction ==
The University of Western Macedonia heritage guide records the operation of a Greek school in Avgerinos before 1750. Vasileios Papaefthymiou, a teacher and translator from Kostantsikon, taught in Semlin and Vienna. His Greek translation of A Concise History of Greece was published in Vienna in 1807.

An educational survey dating to about 1875 recorded a school in Kostantsikon using the monitorial system, with two elementary classes and a preparatory class for further Greek schooling.

A local history published by MyVoio Magazine states that the later stone school building was inaugurated in 1952 and that the school ceased operating in 1996.

Georgios I. Karagiannis (1881–1963), who was born in Avgerinos, left part of his estate to the village's churches and to an educational scholarship endowment. The endowment, administered through the Municipality of Voio, awards scholarships to higher-education students originating from Avgerinos.

== Culture and heritage ==
=== Architecture and religious heritage ===
Traditional structures in Avgerinos include two-storey stone houses and stone-built churches. The central Church of the Dormition of the Theotokos was rebuilt in 1846 and contains a walnut iconostasis and a collection of ecclesiastical objects. The churches of Agia Paraskevi and Agia Triada are situated outside the village.

A 2010 study by art historian Paraskevi Ch. Papadimitriou attributed an icon of Christ Pantocrator found in Avgerinos to Dionysius of Fourna.

=== Folklore museum ===
The former school building now houses a folklore museum established by the Avgerinos Women's Association and inaugurated in 2013. Its collections include historical photographs, regional dress, school and ecclesiastical objects, household items and tools associated with local occupations.

=== Music ===
Avgerinos is one of nine villages identified as the Zoupanochoria in an ethnomusicological study of the area. The study describes the music of these villages as combining Epirote and Macedonian elements. An Avgerinos resident interviewed by the researchers in 2016 recalled the use of violin, ntefi (frame drum) and clarinet before brass instruments became common, and associated Macedonian musical influences with the movement of itinerant stonemasons.
