= Charalambos Vilaetis =

Charalambos Vilaetis Χαράλαμπος Βιλαέτης
- Born: c. 1781; Elis, Ottoman Greece
- Died: 1821; Elis, Ottoman Greece
- Occupation: Greek revolutionary leader

Charalambos Vilaetis (Greek: Χαράλαμπος Βιλαέτης, c. 1781–1821) was a Greek revolutionary leader. He descended from a famous family of Pyrgos and was one of the first to inhabit the area. He moved to Zakynthos in 1806 with the rank of sergeant next to Kolokotronis. He was a member of the Filiki Etaireia. In 1821, he became a leader of the Greeks in Elis. He led the revolution in Pyrgos and raised the Greek flag.

Charalampos Vilaetis was the first to suggest the idea of entrapping the Turks in Lalas. He entered the area of Strefi east of Pyrgos and west of Olympia with 100 people. At the age of 40, he was killed in the battle.
