= Babcock Theatre =

Theater in Billings, Montana

- Babcock Theatre Building
- U.S. National Register of Historic Places
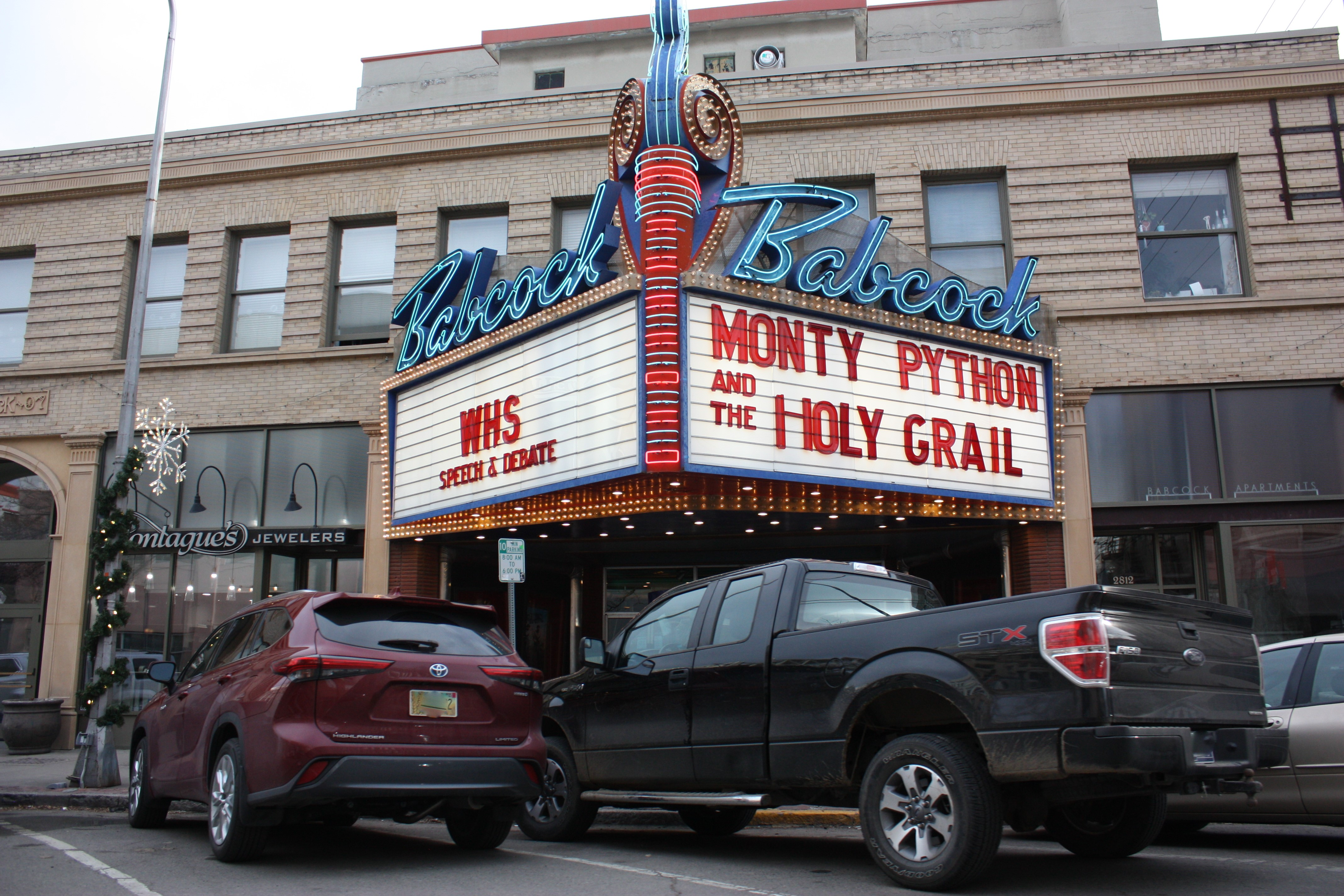
- Babcock Theatre, 2023
- Babcock Theatre Building
- Location: 114–124 N. 28th St. & 2808-2812 2nd Ave. Billings, Montana; U.S.
- Coordinates: 45.7827°N 108.5072°W
- Built: 1907
- Architect: Edwin W. Houghton
- Architectural style: Early Commercial
- Website: arthousebillings.com/babcock
- NRHP reference No.: 13000153
- Added to NRHP: April 9, 2013

The Babcock Theatre is a historic movie theater in downtown Billings, Montana. Constructed in 1907 as an opera house, it replaced an earlier venue on Montana Avenue. Over time, the Babcock transitioned to a movie theater and was remodeled in the Skouras Style in 1955. After initially closing in 1981, the theater opened and closed sporadically in the following decades under a series of different operators. The Babcock is currently owned and operated by Art House, a local nonprofit. The theater has one screen and approximately 700 seats.

The Babcock Theatre Building, which includes the theater, retail spaces, and upstairs apartments, is listed on the National Register of Historic Places. It was restored in 2008–2012.

== History ==
=== Origins ===
Billings was home to an opera house at least as early as 1886, when the Scandia Association's opera hall was built on Montana Avenue by Billings' Scandinavian citizens. (Note: The Scandia Opera House would later transform into the Losekamp Block, which housed the Liberty/Rio Theater.) This 400-seat venue had closed by the time prolific local businessman Albert L. Babcock opened the 800-seat Billings Opera House down the street in 1896. Babcock's opera house was practical in design, but fitted with electric lights and figural ornamentation. Its opening dedication was given by Nellie McHenry. The Billings Opera House was a popular venue for plays and traveling shows. However, it was destroyed by fire on September 22, 1906.

By November, Babcock had announced he would build a new theater on land he already owned at the southwest corner of 2nd Avenue North and North 28th Street (Broadway). By this time, Montana Avenue was in decline, and commercial activity was moving into the previously residential area to the north. Babcock commissioned Seattle-base theater architect Edwin W. Houghton to design the new theater. Plans for the building grew to include office and retail spaces. The new theater opened on December 23, 1907, with a showing of the play The Blue Moon starring James T. Powers.

As it was originally built, the Babcock Theatre could seat 1,350 total. In addition to the floor seating, it had a balcony, accessed from the lobby, as well as a gallery (upper balcony), reached by stairs on the building's exterior alley side. The theater was decorated in a Neoclassical style with statues and decorative plasterwork. The stage was 35 feet (11 m) deep, with dressing rooms underneath for performers. By relying on the latest innovations in theater engineering, the architect omitted structural columns in the seating area under the balcony, giving all seats a clear view of the stage. To test the balcony's structural stability, the builders successfully loaded it with 42,000 pounds (19,000 kg) of nail kegs borrowed from local hardware stores.

Like its predecessor the Billings Opera House, the Babcock Theatre served as a venue for live acts, such as plays, vaudeville, and musical performances. Compared to other smaller theaters in downtown Billings, primarily those near the railroad tracks on Montana and Minnesota Avenues, the Babcock was intended as an upper-class venue. The Babcock was known for its Hope-Jones Wurlitzer organ (Note: Some sources indicate the Wurlitzer was not original to the building, instead being preceded by a Robert Morton organ.) and in-house orchestra. It even hosted a speech by President William Howard Taft in October 1911.

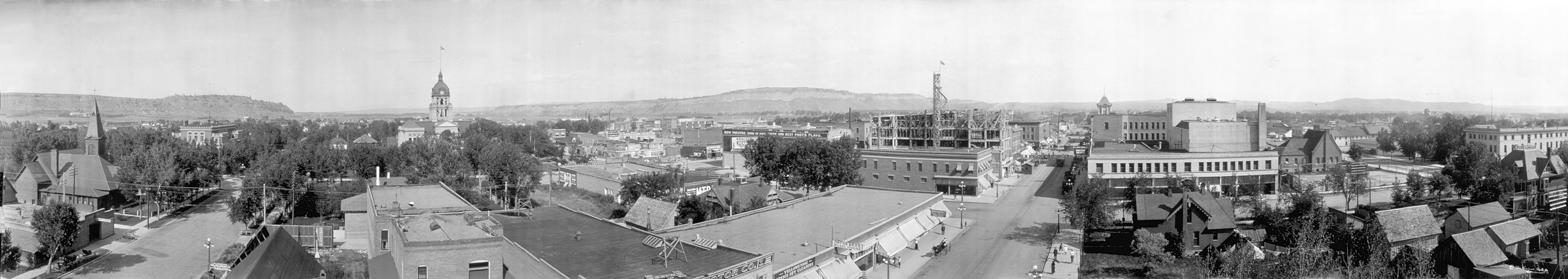
Panoramic view of downtown Billings, 1915, looking east and south from the intersection of North 28th Street (extending away in the photo's right half) and 3rd Avenue North (extending away in the photo's left half). The Babcock Theatre Building is on the center-right, with the theater's roof extended above the building facade.

=== Transition to film ===
During the years of World War I, securing travelling live productions became more difficult. By this time, advancements in the motion picture industry had led to the advent of long-form, narrative-drive silent films, which appealed to members of the upper class who had avoided nickelodeons. The Babcock increased the number of films it showed, and accompanied them with music from its organ and orchestra. However, it continued showing a mix of films and live performances, even as other theaters in downtown Billings relied solely on back-to-back film showings.

After Albert L. Babcock died in 1918, his son Lewis C. Babcock began leasing the family's theater to the Theatre Operating Company in 1923. The company had operated various downtown theaters since 1914. Soon after, the theater was updated with new curtains, scenery sets, stage lighting, and ventilation. In January 1924, the Babcock family sold the entire Babcock Theatre Building to Hyme Lipsker, a local businessman and clothing store owner.

The advent of "talkies"—films with synchronized sound—prompted further renovations. In 1927, the Babcock was completely remodeled to accommodate new projection and sound equipment. While the theater was closed, the Theatre Operating Company took the opportunity to reflect the era's appetite for escapist exoticism. The Neoclassical decorations were removed, replaced by a Spanish Colonial scheme with textured plasterwork, elaborate draperies, wrought iron light fixtures, new lobby staircases, and a blue velour stage curtain depicting a Spanish Galleon. The architecture of the theater was radically altered by rebuilding of the proscenium arch, retrofitting box seats into wall chambers for the organ pipes (previously in the basement), removing the gallery level, and softening the curve of the balcony. Most radically, the Babcock became a theater where "the show started at the sidewalk"—previously, the theater lobby was only accessible from an arcade-style mallway inside the building. By cutting through walls between the lobby and a former retail storefront, the architect created a new entry vestibule opening onto 2nd Avenue North. With all these changes, the Babcock had been transformed from an opera house into a modern movie theater—one of the first in the Northwestern United States to be equipped to show talkies.

=== Adapting to the times ===
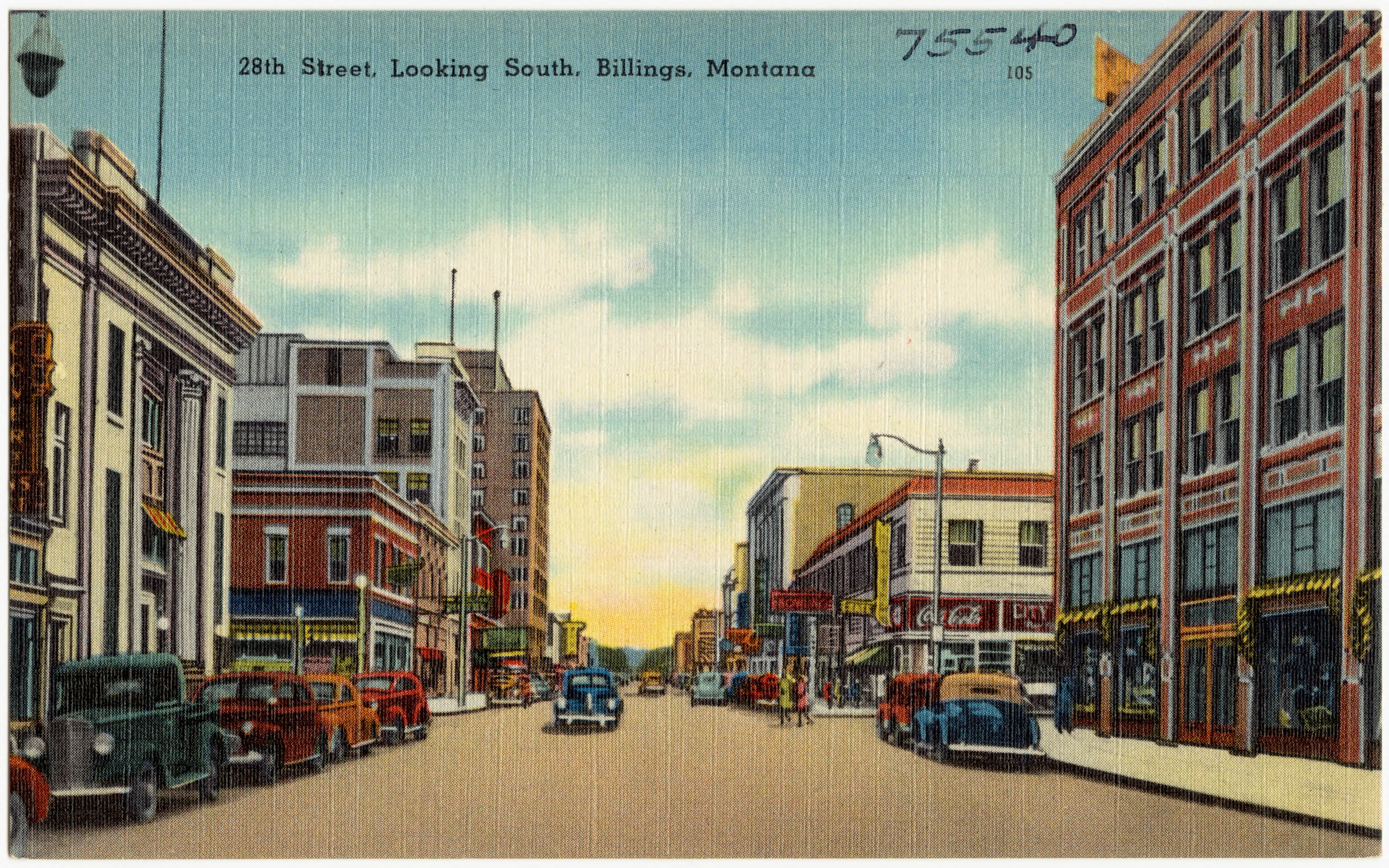
Broadway (N. 28th) looking south, 1930s or 1940s

Just a few years later, the Babcock's status as Billings' premiere theater was threatened when Fox West Coast Theaters announced plans for a new theater one block to the north, replacing the Charles Bair house. Delayed by the onset of the Great Depression, the new Fox Theatre finally opened in fall 1931. The Babcock responded by installing a new marquee and a Kooleraire air conditioning system. However, lower tickets sales because of the Depression created a difficult economic landscape for movie theaters. Although the Babcock did not close like some other downtown theaters, it joined the Fox chain in 1934.

The new owners tried to diversify the Babcock's offerings by adding sporting events. To the concern of the fire chief, the patrons at these events smoked. During a prize fight on February 21, 1935, the fears of the fire chief were justified when the theater caught fire. Though most of the building survived, the theater's roof collapsed, and the pipe organ was completely ruined. The next day, owner Hyme Lipsker announced he would rebuild the theater. It reopened the following summer with automatic fire sprinkling, a reconstructed roof, and art deco decor designed by Anthony Heinsbergen. The centerpiece was an 18-foot (5.5 m) mural Heinsbergen painted in the theater lobby.

By the 1950s, Billings prospered and grew during an oil boom. Under the leadership of Charles Skouras, Fox was remodeling its theaters, many of which had remained in the style of the 1920s because of the economic downturn of the Great Depression and the materials shortages caused by World War II. The Babcock's turn came in 1955, when it was renovated in the Skouras style of Art Moderne. The outside was transformed with a freestanding ticket booth, neon marquee, and movie poster cases. In the lobby, a candy counter replaced the Heinsbergen mural. The restrooms were relocated to the mezzanine level above the lobby. In the theater itself, 923 cushioned seats were installed on rebuilt flooring on both the main and balcony levels, facing the new wide screen and sound towers. Plaster "pillowing" and metallic-painted scrollwork defined the new wall treatments. This midcentury remodel was the theater's last, with the neon marquee enduring as a hallmark of downtown Billings.

=== Decline ===
The Babcock Theatre in 2004, prior to the exterior restoration

As automobile ownership grew and Billings developed suburbs, the downtown district gradually lost its grip on the local theater industry. Moviegoers were drawn to drive-in theaters, and beginning in the 1970s, to multiplex venues. By this time, only three downtown theaters remained in operation: the World, (Note: The World Theater had previously been known as the Majestic, the Strand, the Cozy, the Lyric, and the Dolly.) the Fox, and the Babcock. The World closed in 1978, when it was replaced by the two-screen World West theater near Rimrock Mall. The Fox was briefly converted into a multiplex before transforming into a performing arts venue, the Alberta Bair Theater, in 1987. The Babcock had been reduced to showing R-rated horror films under the local Carisch theater chain; it closed in 1981.

After a brief attempt to make the Babcock Theatre the city's first venue for art films and foreign films, it instead reopened in 1982 under Theatre Operators, Inc., showing blockbuster films. However, the Babcock closed again in 1991. Under a group called Star Fire Productions, the theater was then used for vaudeville shows, but it closed yet again by 1995.

=== 21st century revivals ===
The Babcock Theatre sat vacant for 11 years until fall 2006, when a promoter began leasing it for boxing events. At this time, the building was still owned by Ruth Lipsker Moss, whose father Hyme Lipsker purchased it from Albert L. Babcock in 1924. In 2008, three weeks before her death, Moss sold the Babcock Theatre Building to a group of local investors, who restored the building's exterior and arcade in 2008–2012 and listed it on the National Register of Historic Places. The new owners leased the theater for concerts, films, lectures, and other events.

As a condition of tax funding that partially supported the building's restoration, the City of Billings subsumed ownership over the theater in 2017, leaving the rest of the building in private hands. The next year, the City awarded an operations contract to Art House, a local nonprofit operating the Art House Cinema & Pub in a former bowling alley nearby. Under Art House, the Babcock again showed films regularly, regaining its reputation as one of Billings' premiere movie theaters.

Footage from a 2024 showing of The Rocky Horror Picture Show at the Babcock was featured in Strange Journey: The Story of Rocky Horror.

In 2025, the Babcock's ceiling unexpectedly collapsed, prompting a temporary closure. Art House moved forward with restoring the theater marquee, a project which had already been planned. Rather than paying for the ceiling repairs with public funds, the City of Billings transferred ownership of the Babcock to Art House in 2026. Art House replaced the entire ceiling, including installing additional ceiling trusses and repairing deteriorated decorative molding. The balcony's seats, floor, and steps were completely rebuilt; the aisle seat-ends mimic the Skouras Style originals. The Babcock reopened that October, with Art House planning further rehabilitation work to be completed by 2030.

== Architecture ==
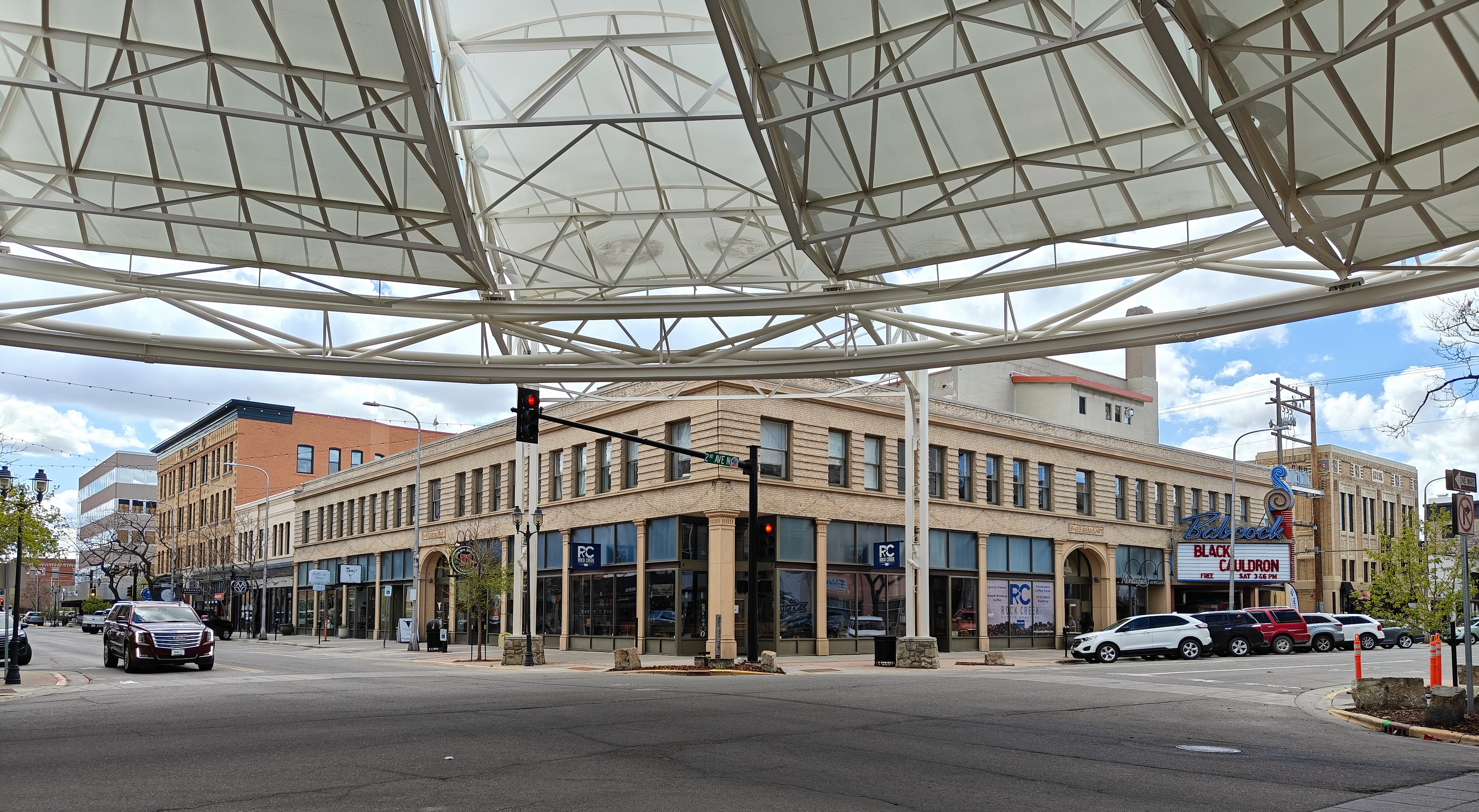
The Babcock Theatre Building and Skypoint

The Babcock Theatre Building contains the theater, seven retail spaces, and sixteen apartments. It is located next to Skypoint, marking the symbolic center of the city, at the intersection of North Broadway and 2nd Avenue North.

The building was designed in the Commercial style and meant to reach seven stories in height. However, only the basement and lower two stories were ultimately constructed. The building measures 140 feet (43 m) by 150 feet (46 m), with the theater marquee on the north side. The walls of the theater portion of the building are 20-inch (51 cm) concrete. Part of the middle of the building is only one story in height, allowing for an interior light court. In the late 1950s, when many of Billings' older downtown buildings were demolished and replaced, the Babcock Theatre Building's second floor was clad over with blue aluminum panels to modernize its appearance. The cladding was removed when the building was restored in 2008–2012, and the ground-level storefronts were restored to their original window layouts.

Ticket booth

Inside, the theater is a well-preserved example of the Skouras Style of Art Moderne theater architecture, which took advantage of aluminum to create ornamental scrollwork that would have been impossible with earlier plaster-molding techniques. The Babcock retains its period ticket booth, lobby ceiling, chrome handrails, proscenium arch, and wall ornamentation. Above the lobby is a mezzanine level, where the restrooms are located, which opens onto the balcony.

The theater and retail spaces were originally accessed from an L-shaped arcade (mallway) inside the building. The arcade remains as an interior hallway with original mosaic tile, as well as glass blocks in the floor that help light the basement spaces below.

The second floor—accessed from the storefront between the theater and the alley—has 16 apartments. Most are one-bedroom or studio units. Each apartment has an arched window, entrance, and small delivery door that face the main hallway. Some apartments were previously inhabited by members of the Babcock family, and later by the Lipsker family, who owned the building for over 80 years until 2008.

Apartments lobby

Second floor hallway

Stairs down to arcade
