= House Broken (album) =

2016 live album by Pavlov's Dog

Live album and video by Pavlov's Dog
- Released: August 19, 2016
- Recorded: October 26, 2015
- Venues: Der Hirsch, Nuremberg
- Genres: Progressive rock, art rock
- Length: 131:47 (CDs); 132:46 (DVD)
- Label: Rockville Music
- Director: Andreas Weimann
- Producer: Manfred Ploetz

Pavlov's Dog chronology
The Pekin Tapes (2014)	House Broken (2016)	Prodigal Dreamer (2018)

Audio sample
- "Canadian Rain": file; help

Professional ratings
Review scores
Source	Rating
Betreutes Proggen (in German)	13/15 stars
DMME	4.75/5 stars
Get Ready to ROCK!	5/5 stars
Musik Reviews (in German)	favorable
Rock Times (in German)	favorable
Rocktopia	favorable
The Great Rock Bible	7/10 stars

House Broken is the second live album by American progressive rock/AOR band Pavlov's Dog, released in 2016.

The album is an audio-visual recording of Pavlov's Dog live concert at the Der Hirsch music venue in Nuremberg, Germany, during their 2015 European Tour.

The band performed songs from their previously released albums, their then upcoming album Prodigal Dreamer, two songs from David Surkamp's solo work Dancing on the Edge of a Teacup, as well as one song from Hi-Fi's album Moods for Mallards. They also played the previously unreleased "Canadian Rain", with David Surkamp introducing the song as one of the last things he wrote with Douglas Rayburn before the latter died in 2012. "Crying Forever" was written by Surkamp for Savoy Brown, included in their 2007 studio album Steel. Pavlov's Dog later recorded their own studio version for their 2018 album Prodigal Dreamer.

As the band's only constant member and leader, David Surkamp thought the line-up Pavlov's Dog had during the time of the album's recording was the best ever. To support that, he said that when he wrote "Did You See Him Cry" for the At the Sound of the Bell album in 1976 the band couldn't play it live because it was too hard for them, while the 2015 members "tear it up".

== Track listing ==
All tracks credited to David Surkamp, except where noted.

=== CD1 ===
No.	Title	Writer(s)	Original Album	Length
1.	"Echo & Boo"		Echo & Boo	3:51
2.	"Late November"	Steve Scorfina, David Surkamp	Pampered Menial	3:12
3.	"Fast Gun"		Pampered Menial	3:35
4.	"Crying Forever"		Prodigal Dreamer	5:17
5.	"Lost In America"	David Surkamp, Douglas Rayburn	Lost in America	4:28
6.	"We All Die Alone"		Echo & Boo	6:01
7.	"Preludin"	Siegfried Carver	Pampered Menial	1:51
8.	"Canadian Rain"	David Surkamp, Douglas Rayburn	previously unreleased	7:32
9.	"Standing Here With You (Megan's Song)"		At the Sound of the Bell	6:59
10.	"Wrong"		Dancing on the Edge of a Teacup	4:54
11.	"Gold Nuggets"		At the Sound of the Bell	6:14
12.	"Try To Hang On"		At the Sound of the Bell	4:59
13.	"One Of These Days"		Dancing on the Edge of a Teacup	3:34
14.	"Walk Away"		Moods for Mallards	4:46
Total length:				67:08

=== CD2 ===
No.	Title	Writer(s)	Original Album	Length
1.	"Only You"		Has Anyone Here Seen Sigfried?	6:43
2.	"I Don't Do So Good Without You"		Echo & Boo	6:34
3.	"Episode"		Pampered Menial	5:52
4.	"Did You See Him Cry"	David Surkamp, Douglas Rayburn	At the Sound of the Bell	6:01
5.	"Song Dance"	Mike Safron	Pampered Menial	7:35
6.	"Valkerie"		At the Sound of the Bell	9:45
7.	"Shaking Me Down"		Prodigal Dreamer	4:26
8.	"Angel's Twilight Jump"		Echo & Boo	5:45
9.	"Theme From Subway Sue"		Pampered Menial	6:43
10.	"Julia"		Pampered Menial	5:21
Total length:				64:39

=== DVD ===
The DVD contains all songs from CD1 and CD2 in the same running order.

== Personnel ==
All information according to the album's liner notes.

Pavlov's Dog

- David Surkamp: vocals, guitar
- Abbie Hainz-Steiling: violin, mandolin, vocals
- Amanda McCoy: guitar, vocals
- Manfred Ploetz: drums
- Rick Steiling: bass guitar
- Nathan Jatcko: keyboards
- Sara Surkamp: vocals, acoustic guitar

Production

- Manfred Ploetz: producer
- Andreas Weimann : film director
- Matthias Lingenfelder: audio engineer
- Saylor Surkamp: introductory film sequence

Artwork

- Sara Surkamp: art direction
- Hanna Barton: cover photography
- Philippe Maquet: band photography
