= Live and Unleashed =

Live album by Pavlov's Dog
- Released: January 28, 2011
- Recorded: Europe, November 2009
- Studios: Mixed in M Music Studios, Munich; Mastered in Clang Studios, Munich
- Genres: Progressive rock, art rock
- Length: 76:14
- Label: Rockville Music
- Producer: Manfred Ploetz

Pavlov's Dog chronology
Echo & Boo (2010)	Live and Unleashed (2011)	The Pekin Tapes (2014)

Audio sample
- "Late November": file; help

Professional ratings
Review scores
Source	Rating
Background Magazine	2.5/5 stars
DMME	4/5 stars
Get Ready to ROCK!	5/5 stars
The Great Rock Bible	6/10 stars
Musik Reviews (in German)	favorable
Rock Hard (in German)	favorable
Rock Times (in German)	favorable
Rocking.gr (in Greek)	mixed
Rocktopia	favorable
Stormbringer (in German)	3.5/5 stars
Vampster (in German)	favorable

Live and Unleashed is the first live album by American progressive rock/AOR band Pavlov's Dog, released in 2011.

The album was recorded during the band's 2009 European Tour, wιth Pavlov's Dog performing songs from their previously released albums, their then upcoming album Echo & Boo, David Surkamp's solo work Dancing on the Edge of a Teacup, as well as one song from Hi-Fi's EP Demonstration Record. During the introduction of the song "Breaking Ice" David Surkamp states that Pavlov's Dog dedicate the tour to the memory of their original violinist Siegfried Carver who died on May 30, 2009.

Several bootleg recordings of Pavlov's Dog past live performances had been circulating years before the release of Live and Unleashed, with the most popular one being Live In Detroit 1976. However, Live and Unleashed is confirmed to be their first officially released live recording.

== Track listing ==
All tracks credited to David Surkamp, except where noted.

No.	Title	Writer(s)	Original Album	Length
1.	"Preludin"	Siegfried Carver	Pampered Menial	2:06
2.	"Of Once And Future Kings"		Pampered Menial	7:00
3.	"Breaking Ice"	David Surkamp, Douglas Rayburn	Lost in America	4:34
4.	"I Don't Need Magic Anymore"		Echo & Boo	5:05
5.	"Heart Of Mine"	David Surkamp, Iain Matthews	Demonstration Record	6:23
6.	"Late November"	Steve Scorfina, David Surkamp	Pampered Menial	3:25
7.	"Not By My Side"	David Surkamp, Douglas Rayburn	Lost in America	2:55
8.	"Theme From Subway Sue"		Pampered Menial	5:58
9.	"Episode"		Pampered Menial	4:45
10.	"I Love You Still"		Echo & Boo	3:23
11.	"Gold Nuggets"		At the Sound of the Bell	4:26
12.	"Looking For My Shadow"		Dancing on the Edge of a Teacup	3:27
13.	"Wrong"		Dancing on the Edge of a Teacup	4:31
14.	"Standing Here With You (Megan’s Song)"		At the Sound of the Bell	5:56
15.	"Angeline"		Echo & Boo	4:48
16.	"Angel’s Twilight Jump"		Echo & Boo	7:32
Total length:				76:14

== Personnel ==
All information according to the album's liner notes

Pavlov's Dog

- David Surkamp: lead vocals, guitar, mandolin
- Mike Safron: drums, backing vocals
- Abbie Hainz: violin, backing vocals, mandolin
- Sara Surkamp: vocals, guitar, percussion
- Bill Franco: guitar
- Nicholas Schlueter: keyboards, backing vocals
- Rick Steiling: bass guitar

Production

- Manfred Ploetz: producer
- Stefan Pfaender : mastering

Artwork

- Sara Surkamp: art direction
- Photos by www.satipics.com and www.bcphoto.co.uk
