= Has Anyone Here Seen Sigfried? =

Studio album by Pavlov's Dog
- Released: August 28, 2007
- Recorded: 1974–1977
- Studios: Technisonic Studios, St. Louis
- Genres: Progressive rock; art rock
- Length: 79:56 (2007 release); 72:53 (2014 release)
- Label: Rockville Music

Pavlov's Dog chronology
The Best of Pavlov's Dog (1995)	Has Anyone Here Seen Sigfried? (2007)	Echo & Boo (2010)

Alternative cover
- 2014 remastered and alternated reissue

Audio sample
- "Only You": file; help

Professional ratings
Review scores
Source	Rating
Cross Fire (in German)	9/10 stars
DMME	4/5 stars
Musik Reviews (in German)	mixed
Prog	4/5 stars
Rock Hard (in Greek)	6.5/10 stars
Rock Hard (in German)	7.5/10 stars
Rock Pages (in Greek)	mixed
Rock Time (in Greek)	favorable
Rock Times (in German)	favorable
The Great Rock Bible	6/10 stars

Has Anyone Here Seen Sigfried? is the fourth studio album by American progressive rock/AOR band Pavlov's Dog, officially released on August 28, 2007.

The album was meant to be the band's third studio release, succeeding At the Sound of the Bell. However, according to lead singer David Surkamp, "the band was falling apart" at the time, the recording sessions were troubled, and Columbia Records "refused to release" the album. The band broke up in 1977, and the recordings were supposed to remain unreleased. Yet, the band's guitarist Steve Scorfina had a tape of the mix from which he created 100 unofficial vinyl copies and released them in 1977 as The St. Louis Hounds. During the next 30 years the album was reissued several times with various titles (most commonly as Third), always as a bootleg.

With the original master tapes lost, Rockville Music enhanced the sound of the bootlegged releases the best they could, added 10 bonus tracks and released the album legally for the first time in 2007. The front cover depicts the band's original violinist Siegfried Carver, who left them shortly after Pampered Menial's release and is the person in question on the album's title.

In 2013, the long-lost master tapes were rediscovered along with the original artwork. A remastered edition was released on March 14, 2014, with different bonus tracks and what was intended to be the original album cover, a drawing of Sherlock Holmes and Dr. Watson.

== Track listing ==
All tracks credited to David Surkamp, except where noted. All information according to the album's liner notes.

=== 2007 first official release ===
No.	Title	Writer(s)	Length
1.	"Only You"		4:33
2.	"Painted Ladies"	David Surkamp, Doug Rayburn	3:22
3.	"Falling In Love"		3:27
4.	"Today"	Marty Balin	3:08
5.	"Trafalgar" (misspelled Trafalger at the CD's back cover)	David Surkamp, Doug Rayburn	3:10
6.	"I Love You Still"		4:05
7.	"Jenny"		4:07
8.	"It's All For You"	Steve Scorfina	3:50
9.	"Suicide"		2:04
10.	"While You Were Out"	Thomas Nickeson	2:38

Bonus tracks
No.	Title	Writer(s)	Length
11.	"Song Dance" (Recorded live at Ambassador Theatre, St. Louis '75, featuring Sigfried Carver on violin)	Mike Safron	6:29
12.	"Of Once And Future Kings" (Recorded live at Ambassador Theatre, St. Louis '75, featuring Sigfried Carver on violin)		6:50
13.	"Natchez Trace" (Recorded live at Ambassador Theatre, St. Louis '75, featuring Sigfried Carver on violin)	Steve Scorfina	4:18
14.	"A Little Better" (Previously unreleased song, recorded live at Ambassador Theatre, St. Louis '75, featuring Sigfried Carver on violin)		2:18
15.	"A Look In Your Eyes" (Previously unreleased song, recorded live at Ambassador Theatre, St. Louis '75, featuring Sigfried Carver on violin)		4:27
16.	"Julia" (Recorded live at Ford Auditorium, Detroit '76)		2:55
17.	"She Came Shining" (Recorded live at Ford Auditorium, Detroit '76)	David Surkamp, Doug Rayburn	4:37
18.	"Did You See Him Cry" (Recorded live at Ford Auditorium, Detroit '76)	David Surkamp, Doug Rayburn	6:07
19.	"Theme From Subway Sue" (Previously unreleased early version, recorded at Pekin studios)		5:40
20.	"I Wait For You" (Previously unreleased song, recorded 1977, performed by D. Surkamp & D. Rayburn)	David Surkamp, Doug Rayburn	1:44
Total length:			79:56

=== 2014 remastered and alternated reissue ===
No.	Title	Writer(s)	Length
1.	"Good Bye Trafalgar" (entitled simply Trafalgar on the 2007 release)	David Surkamp, Doug Rayburn	3:26
2.	"Falling In Love"		3:24
3.	"Only You"		4:31
4.	"Painted Ladies"	David Surkamp, Doug Rayburn	3:18
5.	"I Love You Still"		4:06
6.	"Jenny"		4:08
7.	"Today" (Jefferson Airplane cover)	Marty Balin	3:04
8.	"Stop Short" (studio outtake)		2:38
9.	"It's All For You"	Steve Scorfina	3:49
10.	"Suicide"		2:02
11.	"While You Were Out"	Thomas Nickeson	2:51

Bonus tracks
No.	Title	Writer(s)	Length
12.	"Falling In Love" (Alternative mix)		3:19
13.	"Julia" (Acoustic version recorded by David Surkamp in 2007)		3:04
14.	"She Came Shining" (Recorded live in 2012)	David Surkamp, Doug Rayburn	5:36
15.	"Fast Gun" (Recorded live in 2011)		3:21
16.	"She Breaks Like a Morning Sky" (Recorded live in 2011)	David Surkamp, Doug Rayburn	5:26
17.	"Paris" (Recorded live in 2011)		4:44
18.	"Good Bye Trafalgar" (Recorded live in 2012)	David Surkamp, Doug Rayburn	3:10
19.	"Only You" (Recorded live in 2012)		6:47
Total length:			72:53

== Personnel ==
Main album

- David Surkamp: lead vocals
- Doug Rayburn: keyboards
- Steve Scorfina: lead guitar, rhythm guitar, lead vocals on It's All For You
- Rick Stockton: bass guitar
- Thomas Nickeson: keyboards, guitar, backing vocals
- Kirk Sarkisian: drums

2007 bonus tracks

- David Surkamp: lead vocals
- Doug Rayburn: mellotron, guitar
- Steve Scorfina: lead guitar on tracks 11–19
- Rick Stockton: bass guitar on tracks 11–19
- Mike Safron: drums on tracks 11–15 and 19
- Kirk Sarkisian: drums on tracks 16–18
- David Hamilton: keyboards on tracks 11–15 and 19
- Thomas Nickeson: keyboards on tracks 16–18
- Siegfried Carver: violin on tracks 11–15 and 19

2014 bonus tracks
