= The Best of Pavlov's Dog =

- Artwork based on High Life, a painting by Edwin Landseer.

Compilation album by Pavlov's Dog
- Released: November 2, 1995
- Recorded: 1973–1975
- Studios: CBS Studios, New York City; Record Plant, New York City
- Genres: Progressive rock; art rock
- Length: 53:49
- Label: Columbia
- Producers: Sandy Pearlman, Murray Krugman

Pavlov's Dog chronology
Lost in America (1990)	The Best of Pavlov's Dog (1995)	Has Anyone Here Seen Sigfried? (2007)

The Best of Pavlov's Dog is a compilation album by American progressive rock/AOR band Pavlov's Dog, released in 1995.

It compiles songs from the band's first two albums, Pampered Menial (1975) and At the Sound of the Bell (1976). The album's liner notes give credit to all eight 1973-1976 Pavlov's Dog full-time members for their contributions, but they do not mention the session and guest musicians who also took part in the At the Sound of the Bell recordings.

The album's front cover is a blue colored snippet from Edwin Landseer's painting High Life which was also used in the original back cover of Pampered Menial.

== Track listing ==
All tracks credited to David Surkamp, except where noted.

No.	Title	Writer(s)	Original Album	Length
1.	"Julia"		Pampered Menial	3:10
2.	"Late November"	Steve Scorfina, David Surkamp	Pampered Menial	3:12
3.	"She Came Shining"	David Surkamp, Douglas Rayburn	At the Sound of the Bell	4:15
4.	"Standing Here With You (Megan's Song)"		At the Sound of the Bell	3:50
5.	"Song Dance"	Mike Safron	Pampered Menial	4:58
6.	"Natchez Trace"		Pampered Menial	3:42
7.	"Theme from Subway Sue"		Pampered Menial	4:24
8.	"Mersey"	David Surkamp, Steve Scorfina	At the Sound of the Bell	3:04
9.	"Gold Nuggets"		At the Sound of the Bell	3:28
10.	"Did You See Him Cry"	David Surkamp, Douglas Rayburn	At the Sound of the Bell	5:39
11.	"Episode"		Pampered Menial	4:03
12.	"Preludin"	Siegfried Carver	Pampered Menial	1:36
13.	"Valkerie"		At the Sound of the Bell	5:22
14.	"Fast Gun"		Pampered Menial	3:06
Total length:				53:49

== Personnel ==
See Pampered Menial personnel and At the Sound of the Bell personnel accordingly
