= Spyros Skouras =

American film executive (1893–1971)

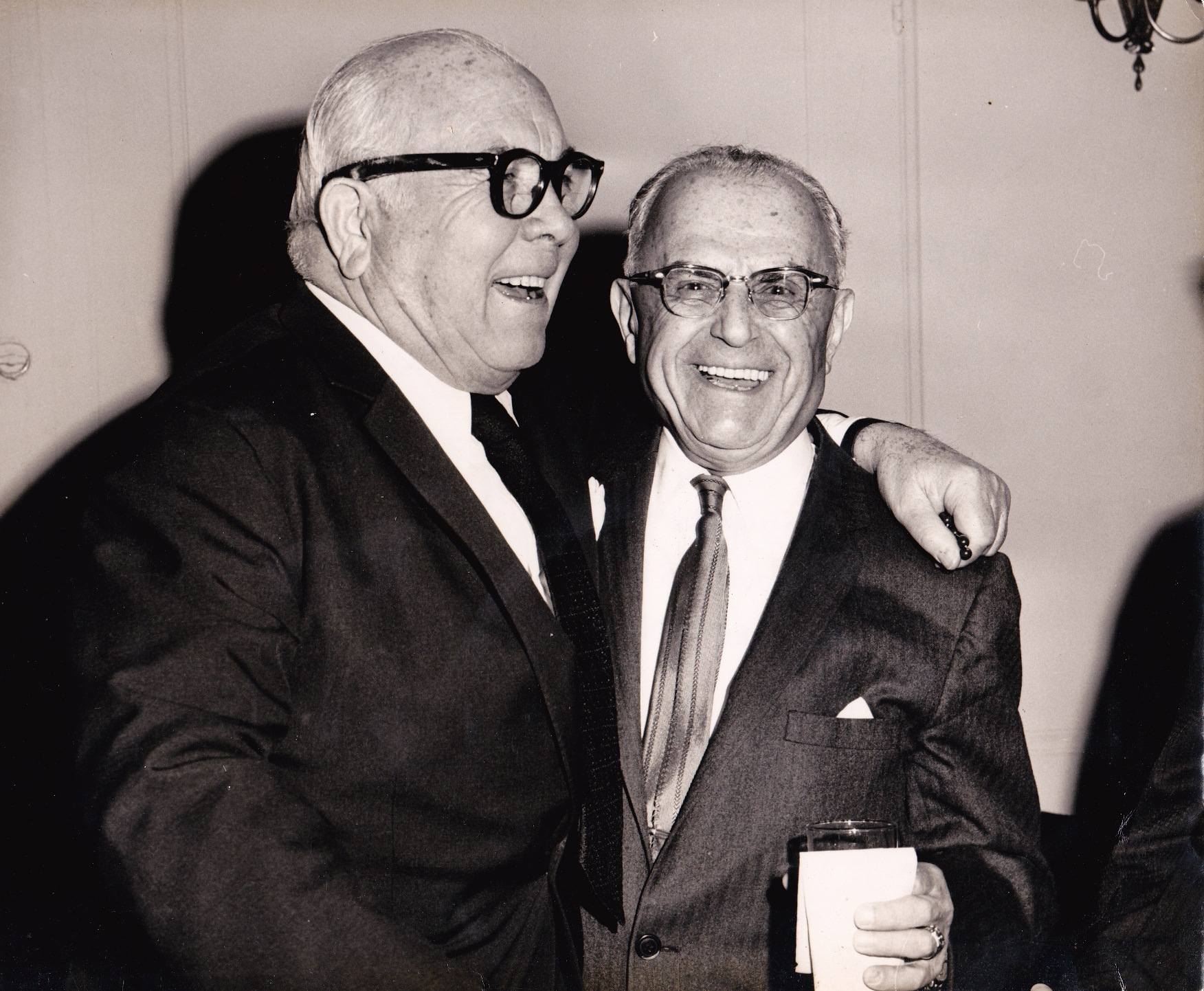
- Skouras with Alan E. Freedman in 1960
- Born: Spyros Panagiotis Skouras; March 28, 1893; Skourochori, Greece
- Died: August 16, 1971 (aged 78); Mamaroneck, New York, US
- Occupation: Film executive
- Board member of: Skouras Brothers Enterprises, 20th Century Fox
- Spouse: Saroula Bruiglia (m.1920)
- Children: 5
- Relatives: Charles and George (brothers)

Spyros Panagiotis Skouras (/ˈskʊərəs/; Greek: Σπύρος Σκούρας; March 28, 1893 – August 16, 1971) was a Greek-American motion picture pioneer and film executive who was the president of 20th Century-Fox from 1942 to 1962. He resigned June 27, 1962, but was chairman of the company for several more years. He also had numerous ships, owning Prudential Lines.

Skouras and two brothers came to the United States as immigrants in 1910; Spyros kept such a pronounced Greek accent in English that comedian Bob Hope would joke "Spyros has been here twenty years but he still sounds as if he's coming next week." Skouras oversaw the production of such epics as Cleopatra (1963) with Elizabeth Taylor, as well as the development of Century City.

== The early years ==
Spyros Panagiotis Skouras was born in 1893 in Skourochori, Greece to a family whose father was a sheep herder. Together with his brothers Charles and George Skouras, he emigrated to the United States in 1910. The brothers settled in St. Louis, Missouri, at that time the fourth-largest city in America and a booming industrial center.

Living frugally on wages as busboys and bartenders in downtown hotels, by 1914 the brothers had savings of $3,500. In partnership with two other Greeks, the Skourases constructed a modest nickelodeon at 1420 Market Street; today's Kiel Opera House now occupies this site. They called their theater the Olympia, and soon acquired other theaters.

The brothers incorporated in 1924 with $400,000 capital stock. By then more than thirty local theaters belonged to the Skouras Brothers Co. of St. Louis. The biggest moment for the Skouras empire came when their dream of building a world-class movie palace in downtown St. Louis was realized in 1926 when they opened the $5.5 million Ambassador Theatre Building. In 1929, following the Stock Market Crash, the brothers sold their interest to Warner Brothers and moved east, gaining executive places in the industry, which was then based in the New York area.

From 1929 to 1931 during the Great Depression, Spyros Skouras worked as a general manager of the Warner Brothers Theater Circuit in the United States. During these hard years, he eliminated losses and eventually quadrupled the profits of the chain. Despite this success, his wish to be his own boss again made him voluntarily leave the company. After that, and for a short while, he worked as a manager for Paramount.

In 1932, the Skouras Brothers (Charles, Spyros and George) took over the management of the Fox West Coast Theater chain, with more than 500 theaters. The studio was threatened with bankruptcy due to falloff in business because of the Depression. The three brothers worked to help the company survive.

=== Marriage and family ===
Skouras had several children with his wife, including sons Spyros S. Skouras and Plato A. Skouras. His daughter committed suicide by jumping from a building. Athanasios Skouras, member of the Greek Resistant Organisation PEAN during the Axis Occupation of Greece in the Second World War, was a relative of his.

== Rise to influence ==
In May 1935 Spyros Skouras took the initiative for the merger of Fox Studios with Twentieth Century Pictures. He was president of the merged company 20th Century Fox from 1942 to 1962. Skouras was also a major stockholder of 20th Century Fox.

In the 1950s he, together with his brothers, controlled 20th Century Fox, National Theaters, Fox West Coast Theaters, United Artists Theaters, Skouras Theaters, Magna Corp, and Todd AO. Skouras' assets in 1952 amounted to $108,000,000, greater than any other theater or movie mogul, including the Schencks, Warners, Shuberts, or his countryman Alexander Pantages.

Skouras oversaw the production of such classics as Don't Bother to Knock, The Seven Year Itch, The Hustler, The King and I, Gentlemen Prefer Blondes and The Robe. He signed a young model named Norma Jean Baker to 20th Century Fox who, after changing her name to Marilyn Monroe, rose to fame as the most famous Hollywood sex symbol of the 20th century. Monroe, who never knew her father, developed a special relationship with Skouras, and sometimes called him "Papa Skouras".

During Skouras' tenure, the longest in the company's history, he worked to rescue the faltering film industry from the lure of television. 20th Century Fox's advertising slogan, Movies are Better than Ever, gained credibility in 1953 when Spyros introduced CinemaScope in the studio's groundbreaking feature film The Robe. The wide screen CinemaScope increased the appeal of films, helping them maintain audiences against television. This new technology soon became the standard of the whole industry.

== Later years ==
Cost overruns on such films as Cleopatra (1963) resulted in a shareholder revolt demanding a change in management. Darryl F. Zanuck was elected president of the company while Skouras was chairman of the company for several years.

In parallel with his work in the film industry, Skouras had invested in the shipping industry, where many Greek immigrants had interest. By the 1960s, his Prudential Lines owned seven ships, two tankers, and five cargo ships. In 1969, Prudential Lines bought out Grace Lines. In the last years of his life, Skouras disengaged from the movie world and spent more time on his various maritime projects. His son Spyros S. Skouras eventually took these over.

His son Plato A. Skouras (1930–2004) produced five films, including Francis of Assisi (1961) and Sierra Baron (1958).

Skouras died from a heart attack at the age of 78.
