= House Broken =

House Broken may refer to:

- House Broken (1936 film), a British film
- House Broken (2009 film), an American film
- House Broken (album), a 2016 live album by Pavlov's Dog
- HouseBroken, a 2021 American animated series
