= The Pekin Tapes =

Studio album by Pavlov's Dog
- Released: November 28, 2014
- Recorded: October 1973 (main album); March 1973 (bonus tracks)
- Studios: Golden Voice Studios, Pekin, Illinois
- Genres: Progressive rock, art rock
- Label: Rockville Music
- Producer: Pavlov's Dog

Pavlov's Dog chronology
Live and Unleashed (2011)	The Pekin Tapes (2014)	House Broken (2016)

Audio sample
- "Subway Sue": file; help

Professional ratings
Review scores
Source	Rating
Cross Fire (in German)	7.5/10 stars
Exposé Online	favorable
Gaesteliste (in German)	favorable
Musik Reviews (in German)	favorable
Power Metal (in German)	9/10 stars
Prog	favorable
Rock Times (in German)	favorable
Zware Metalen (in Dutch)	favorable

The Pekin Tapes is the sixth studio album by American progressive rock/AOR band Pavlov's Dog, released in 2014.

The album was recorded in October 1973 in just three days and produced by the band themselves, with the intention of earning them a contract with a record label to release it as their debut. Impressed by the album's quality, ABC Records signed Pavlov's Dog on a $650,000 deal, but the company decided they needed to refine the material before releasing it. Under the guidance of Sandy Pearlman and Murray Krugman, five of The Pekin Tapes's songs were re-recorded, and with the addition of four new compositions they became the band's debut album Pampered Menial in early 1975.

The original recordings remained unreleased and were thought destroyed in 1977 when Golden Voice Studios burned down, but in 2014 a well-preserved copy was discovered in a private collection. Rockville Music restored the tape the best they could and released the album in November 2014. The album's bonus tracks are demos recorded in March 1973, and they are the earliest known Pavlov's Dog recordings.

== Track listing ==
All information according to the album's liner notes.
Tracks in bold were re-recorded for Pavlov's Dog debut album Pampered Menial.

Main tracks: recorded in October 1973
No.	Title	Writer(s)	Lead vocals	Length
1.	"**Subway Sue**"	David Surkamp	David Surkamp	5:53
2.	"**Natchez Trace**"	Steve Scorfina	Surkamp	3:57
3.	"Time"	David Hamilton	David Hamilton	5:25
4.	"Stomp Water Magic"	Scorfina	Surkamp	3:50
5.	"It's All for You"	Scorfina	Scorfina	5:21
6.	"**Song Dance**"	Mike Safron	Surkamp	5:44
7.	"Dreams"	Surkamp	Surkamp	4:58
8.	"Clipper Ship"	Hamilton	Hamilton	5:33
9.	"**Fast Gun**"	Surkamp	Surkamp	3:35
10.	"**Preludin & Fellacio in E Minor**"	Sigfried Carver	instrumental	7:30

Bonus tracks: the earliest available Pavlov's Dog demo recordings from March 1973
No.	Title	Writer(s)	Lead vocals	Length
11.	"Brand New Day"	Surkamp	Surkamp	3:34
12.	"**Natchez Trace**"	Scorfina	Surkamp	4:07
13.	"**Fast Gun**"	Surkamp	Surkamp	3:42
14.	"I Wish It Would Rain"	Surkamp	Surkamp	5:05
Total length:				68:19

== Personnel ==
All information according to the album's liner notes

Pavlov's Dog

- David Surkamp – vocals, guitar
- Steve Scorfina – lead guitar, vocals
- David Hamilton – keyboards, vocals
- Doug Rayburn – keyboards, mellotron
- Sigfried Carver – violin
- Rick Stockton – bass guitar, backing vocals
- Mike Safron – drums, backing vocals

Production

- Pavlov's Dog – production of the original recording
- Christoph Stickel – mastering and restoration
- Manfred Ploetz – mastering and restoration

Artwork

- Hannah Detring
- Gregory Davis
- Jonathan Pelhank
