= Prodigal Dreamer =

- Artwork based on A Jack in Office, a painting by Edwin Landseer.

Studio album by Pavlov's Dog
- Released: December 7, 2018
- Studio: Pan Galactic Studios, St. Louis
- Genre: Progressive rock, art rock
- Length: 59:05
- Label: Rockville Music
- Producer: Paul Hennerich, David Surkamp, Sara Surkamp

Pavlov's Dog chronology
House Broken (2016)	Prodigal Dreamer (2018)

Audio sample
- "Paris": file; help

Professional ratings
Review scores
Source	Rating
Decibel Geek	favorable
DMME	4.33/5 stars
Musik Reviews (in German)	12/15 stars
Rock Hard (in German)	8/10 stars
Rocks (in German)	8/10 stars
Sonic Perspectives	7/10 stars
The Great Rock Bible	7/10 stars

Prodigal Dreamer is the seventh studio album by American progressive rock/AOR band Pavlov's Dog, released in 2018.

According to the band's long-standing leader David Surkamp most of the album's songs were newly composed at the time, but "Paris" existed since 1977 and "Thrill of it All" was written "maybe a couple of years later". Both songs are credited to Surkamp and former Pavlov's Dog member Douglas Rayburn, who died in 2012. "Hard Times" is a song Surkamp wrote during Donald Trump's 2017 inauguration, as he felt depressed by the circumstance. "Crying Forever" was written by Surkamp for Savoy Brown, included in their 2007 studio album Steel. Pavlov's Dog used to play the song live in concerts before the release of their own studio version with Prodigal Dreamer, as indicated by its inclusion in their 2016 live album House Broken. A live version of "Shaking me Down" is also part of that album.

Nathan Jatcko, then member of the band since 2015, recorded some keyboard parts on an electric piano during the album's sessions, with the intention to re-record them on a grand piano in their final form. However, Jatcko committed suicide on January 17, 2018 and was replaced by Mark Maher who completed the recordings. Prodigal Dreamer is dedicated to Jatcko's memory.

The album's artwork consists of various black and white snippets from Edwin Landseer's paintings A Jack in Office and Low Life. Pavlov's Dog also based the cover of their debut album Pampered Menial on Low Life. Both paintings represent the same overweight dog, a mainstay of the band's image through the years.

In support of the album Pavlov's Dog set out the Prodigal Dreamer Tour 2019, playing nine dates in Europe from November 11 to November 23, 2019.

== Track listing ==
All tracks credited to David Surkamp, except where noted.

No.	Title	Writer(s)	Length
1.	"Paris"	David Surkamp, Douglas Rayburn	4:43
2.	"Hard Times"		4:26
3.	"Winterblue"		4:06
4.	"Thrill Of It All"	David Surkamp, Douglas Rayburn	5:55
5.	"Easter Day"		2:45
6.	"Hurting Kind"		6:27
7.	"Aria"		4:46
8.	"Waterlow"		4:23
9.	"Suzanne"		3:54
10.	"Crying Forever"		4:04
11.	"Being In Love"		2:32
12.	"Shaking Me Down"		4:17
13.	"The Winds Wild Early"		6:41
Total length:			59:05

== Personnel ==
Pavlov's Dog (in album liner notes order)

- David Surkamp: vocals, acoustic guitar, electric guitar
- Sara Surkamp: vocals, acoustic guitar
- Abbie Hainz-Steiling: violin
- Rick Steiling: bass guitar
- Manfred Ploetz: drums
- Mark Maher: grand piano, Hammond organ, synthesizer
- David Malachowski: electric guitar

Guest Musicians (in alphabetical order)

- Paul Hennerich: trumpet
- Robert Marstiller: auxiliary percussion, backing vocals
- Saylor Surkamp: backing vocals
- Hollie Woods: backing vocals

Production

- Paul Hennerich: producer, recording engineer
- David Surkamp: producer
- Sara Surkamp: producer
- Robert Marstiller: assistant recording engineer
- Aaron Kinney: assistant recording engineer
- David MacRunnel: assistant recording engineer
- Bill Schulenburg: mastering engineer

Artwork

- All images used are snippets from Edwin Landseer's paintings A Jack in Office and Low Life
