= Echo & Boo =

The Adventures of Echo & Boo and Assorted Small Tails

Studio album by Pavlov's Dog
- Released: October 8, 2010
- Studios: Pan Galactic Studios, St. Louis
- Genres: Progressive rock; art rock
- Length: 51:28
- Label: Rockville Music
- Producers: David Surkamp, Sara Surkamp

Pavlov's Dog chronology
Has Anyone Here Seen Sigfried? (2007)	The Adventures of Echo & Boo and Assorted Small Tails (2010)	Live and Unleashed (2011)

Audio sample
- "Angeline": file; help

Professional ratings
Review scores
Source	Rating
Background Magazine	2.5/5 stars
Classic Rock	3.5/5 stars
DMME	4/5 stars
Get Ready to ROCK!	4.5/5 stars
The Great Rock Bible	4/10 stars
Musik Reviews (in German)	11/15 stars
Rock Hard (in German)	8/10 stars
Rock Times (in German)	favorable
Rocking.gr (in Greek)	favorable
Rocktopia	favorable
Rockway (in Greek)	favorable
Stormbringer (in German)	3/5 stars
Vintage Rock	favorable

Echo & Boo, also known as The Adventures of Echo & Boo and Assorted Small Tails, is the fifth studio album by American progressive rock/AOR band Pavlov's Dog, released in 2010.

It was the band's first album with new material since Lost in America, and includes two original Pavlov's Dog members: their long-standing frontman David Surkamp and drummer Mike Safron. The album is dedicated to the band's original violinist Siegfried Carver who died in 2009.

The album's cover depicts David Surkamp's father and uncle at a young age, as well as the dog that appears on the cover of the band's debut album Pampered Menial.

== Track listing ==
All tracks credited to David Surkamp except where noted.

No.	Title	Length
1.	"Angeline"	4:35
2.	"Angel's Twilight Jump"	5:17
3.	"I Love You Still"	3:25
4.	"I Don't Do So Good Without You"	5:18
5.	"Echo & Boo"	4:28
6.	"The Death Of North American Industry Suite: "We Walk Alone Forever" – 2:06; "Oh! Susanna" (Stephen Foster cover) – 1:00; "We Walk Alone Forever Again" – 1:10; "Ava Gardner's Bust" – 3:47"	7:53
7.	"Calling Out For Mine"	4:08
8.	"We All Die Alone"	5:05
9.	"Jubilation"	5:36
10.	"I Don't Need Magic Anymore"	5:37
Total length:		51:28

== Personnel ==
All information according to the album's liner notes

Pavlov's Dog

- David Surkamp: vocals, acoustic guitar, twelve-string guitar, electric guitar, piano, keyboards, bass, mandolin
- Mike Safron: drums, drum programming
- Sara Surkamp: vocals, guitar, percussion
- Nick Schlueter: piano, vocals
- Abbie Hainz: violin, vocals
- Rick Stieling: bass
- Bill Franco: electric guitar

Guest Musicians

- Phil Gomez: piano on tracks 1, 2, 3, 9
- Jean Baue: soprano vocals on tracks 1, 2, 3, 4
- Saylor Surkamp: backing vocals on tracks 2, 5, 6b
- Nick Oliveri: backing vocals on Ava Gardner's Bust
- John Wallach: bass on Ava Gardner's Bust
- "Bongo" Billy Costello: drums, arp, chimes, percussion on tracks 1, 2, 3, 4, 8, 9, 10
- Keith Moyer: flugelhorn on I Don't Do So Good Without You
- Michael McElvain: piano on I Don't Need Magic Anymore

Production

- David Surkamp: production
- Sara Surkamp: recording engineering, audio mixing, mastering, production
- Paul Hennerich: audio mixing, mastering
- Mike Safron: additional production

Artwork

- Sara Surkamp: cover art design and production
