= George Skouras =

American movie executive

George P. Skouras (/ˈskʊərəs/; Greek: Γεώργιος Σκούρας; 1896–1964) was an American movie executive and president of United Artists Theatres, born in Skourohorion, Greece. He was one of ten children of a sheep herder and his wife. He and two older brothers emigrated to the United States about 1910 and rose in the new movie industry to become top movie executives. The extended Skouras family continue to be actively involved in the Hollywood film industry today.

== Life and career ==
The Skouras brothers, George and his older brothers Charles and Spyros, arrived in St. Louis in 1908–11. Working as busboys and bartenders in downtown hotels, they lived frugally. In 1914 they pooled their savings of $3500 and, in partnership with two other Greeks, constructed a nickelodeon at 1420 Market Street. This site is now occupied by Kiel Opera House. They named their first theater the Olympia, and soon acquired others.

The brothers incorporated in 1924 with $400,000 capital stock. By then the Skouras Brothers Co. owned more than 30 local theaters. In 1926 they opened the world-class $5.5 million Ambassador Theatre, a movie palace on Grand. (This theatre re-opened in 1939 as the New Fox Theatre and has been restored as a venue for live performances). In 1929, following the Stock Market Crash, the triumvirate sold out to Warner Brothers and moved east to gain executive places in the industry, then based in New York.

In November 1944, George toured the Peloponnese, filming the destruction of Greek countryside following the withdrawal of German troops.

George Skouras become president of United Artists Theatres. In 1952 he joined United Artists with Michael Todd and Joe Schenck, former president of Twentieth Century Fox, in order to form the Magna Theatre Corporation for production and distribution of Todd-AO films.
