= Alberta Bair Theater =

Theater in Billings, Montana, United States

Coordinates: 45.7839°N 108.5080°W

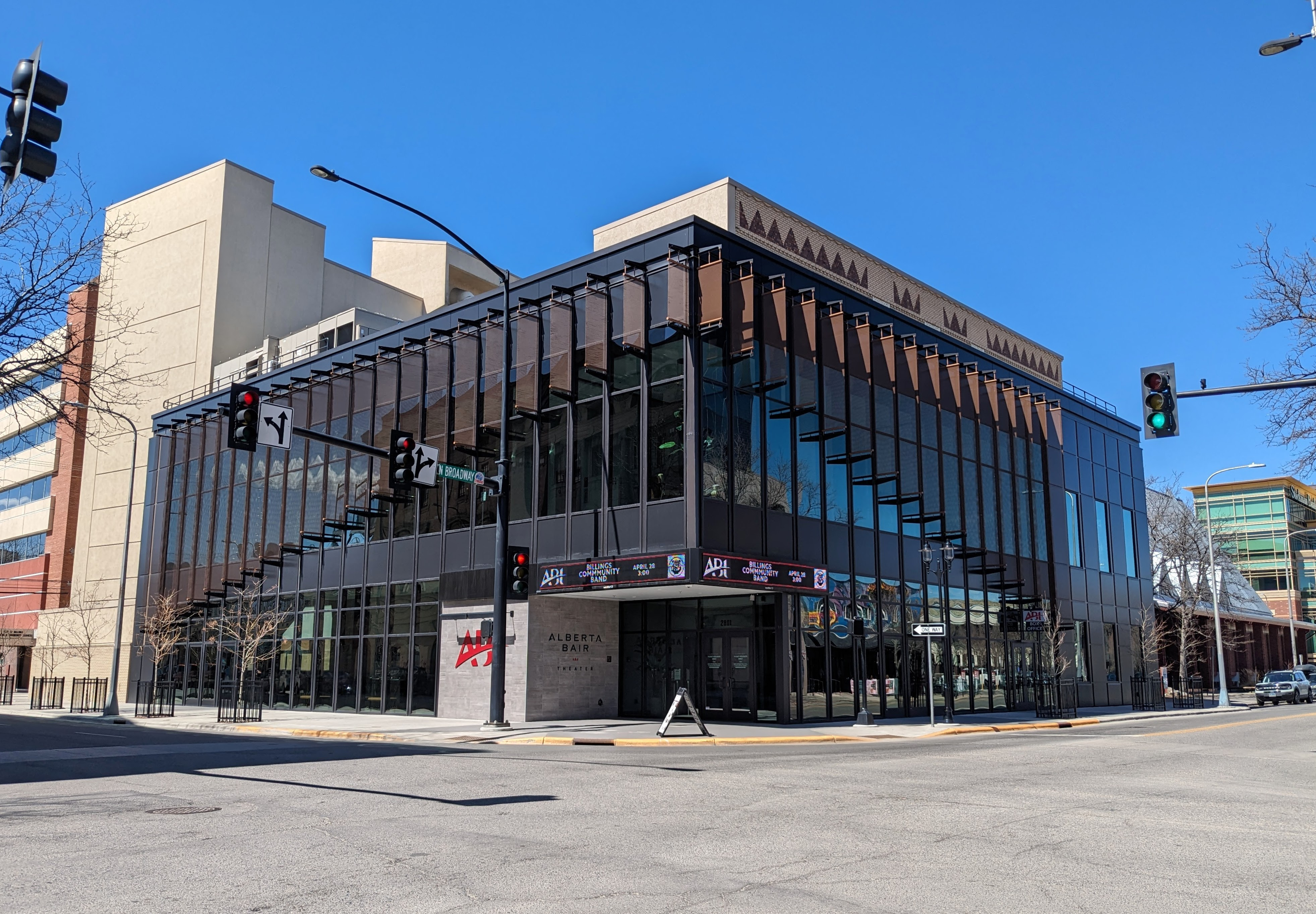
Alberta Bair Theater, 2024

The Alberta Bair Theater is a performing arts center in Billings, Montana. It hosts performances ranging from local groups to nationally touring performers. Its address is 2801 3rd Ave North, on land that was previously the homestead of businessman Charles M. Bair, located in what is now downtown Billings. The theater was originally named the Fox Theater, but in 1987, the theater was renamed the Alberta Bair Theater in honor of his daughter Alberta in 1987, who made the largest donation to the theater's 1980s renovation.

The theater has 1,394 seats. It is the only performing arts center between Spokane, Washington and Denver, Colorado that is fully equipped for presenting shows by major professional touring companies and artists.

The theater is a 501(c)(3) nonprofit organization. It hosts educational programs and discount performances, and it is partially supported by volunteers.

== History ==
The originally Art Deco-inspired theater was designed by Robert Reamer in the 1920s and built during the Great Depression, opening in 1931 as "the last of the Fox Corporation’s vaudeville and motion picture houses," even with budget cuts. Its initial design included: marble surfaces; red and blue carpet; green, rose, and gold accents; and as many as 2,138 lights. The Billings Gazette described the original decor: "Hand-painted wall motifs of hunters armed with arrows pursuing gazelles were accented by silver clouds adorning the ceilings." The auditorium seated around 1,400 people. Merely Mary Ann was one of the movies played during the theater's opening night. Throughout the 1930s and 1940s, the theater hosted performers including national and international stars like Boris Karloff, the actor behind Frankenstein's monster, musicians such as singers Marian Anderson, Gladys Swarthout, Ray Charles, and Judy Collins, and instrumentalists Gregor Piatigorsky, Dizzy Gillespie, and George Winston. They shared the stage with local organizations like the Billings Symphony Orchestra.

However, the rising popularity of drive-in theaters and suburban, mall-linked movie theaters led to the theater's decline – and the decline of those nearby like it, such as the Babcock Theatre – during the 1950s and 60s. It decayed until a local "Save the Arts" campaign purchased the building, which was in heavy need of renovations. According to a founding member of the theater's board, "It smelled and it was just run down, and it sat atop an underground river. It was just wet, with water running down the steps. It was unbelievable." The restorers decided not to restore the original design due to cost and practicality; the community needed a performing arts area in general, since the surrounding downtown area decayed similarly as the oil industry evaporated and passenger trains stopped running to the city. Money came in from donations, the largest of which came from Alberta Bair, the last surviving member of the family who originally owned the land on which the theater was built; she had been born on the location. Other donations included local newspapers, area banks, and community members. The city of Billings also helped to finance the purchase and became the owner of the property, leasing it back to the organization for a low price.

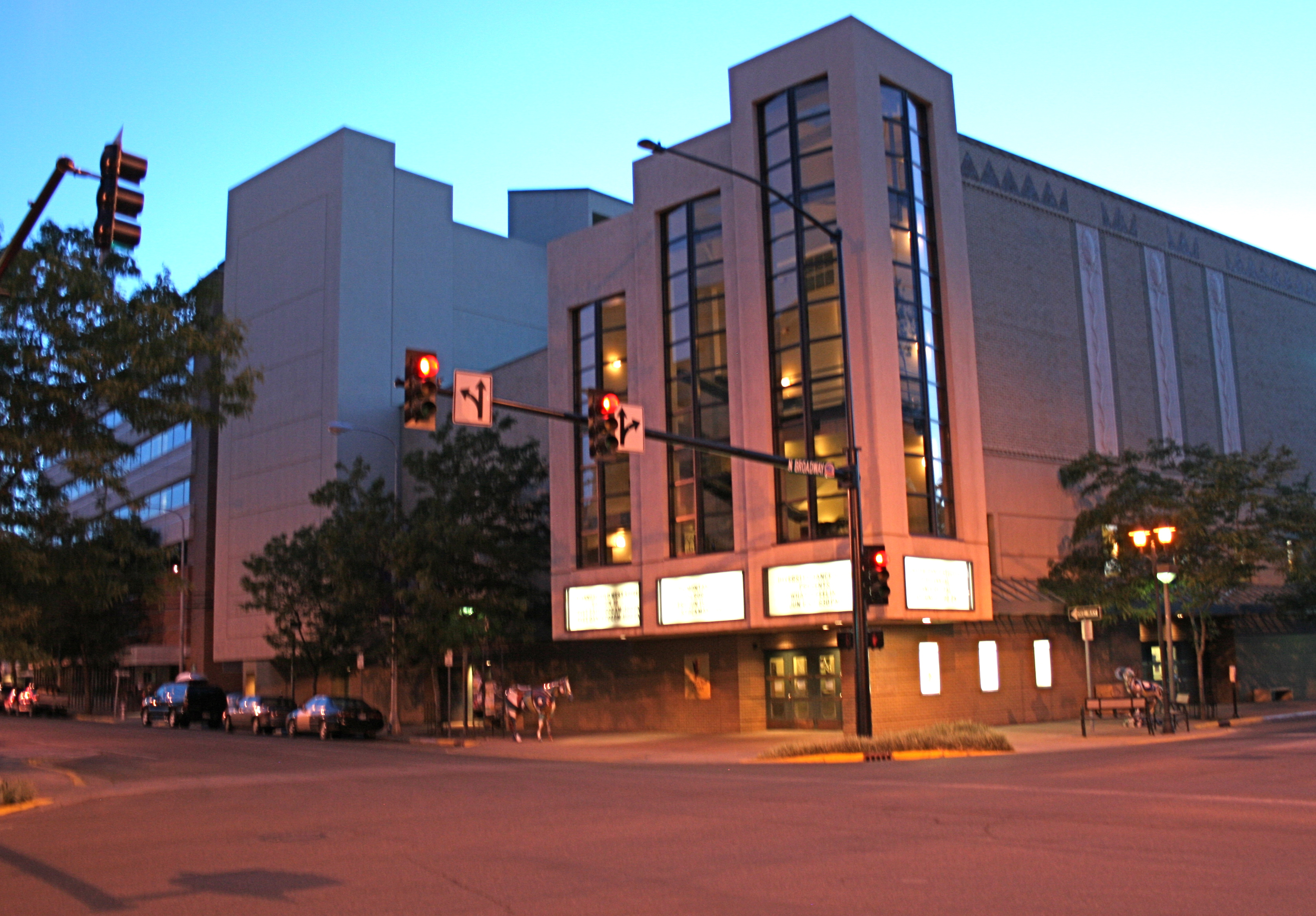
The theater in 2012

In 1987, the theater reopened to host local organizations and attract touring events. After its reopening, notable performers included Bobby McFerrin, Martha Graham, Juilliard String Quartet, Joan Baez, The Temptations, and various Broadway musicals.

The theater underwent a $13.6 million renovation in 2019-2020, once again backed by the Bair family (in form of a trust), local banks, community members, and the city. Aside from visible elements such as new seats and a new facade, much of the renovations involved making the theater ADA-accessible and updating the electric elements. The theater reopened in September 2021.

== Programs ==
Productions range from those of small local organizations to Broadway theatre tours, while a volunteer program supports events at the theater with duties including ushering, clerical work, and specialized projects. The theater hosts community programs including discounted student tickets with educational materials, professional activities, tours of the theater, and other discounted ticket or ticket voucher programs for disadvantaged groups. The programs serve around 25,000 students annually.
