= Pavlov's Dog (band) =

American progressive rock band

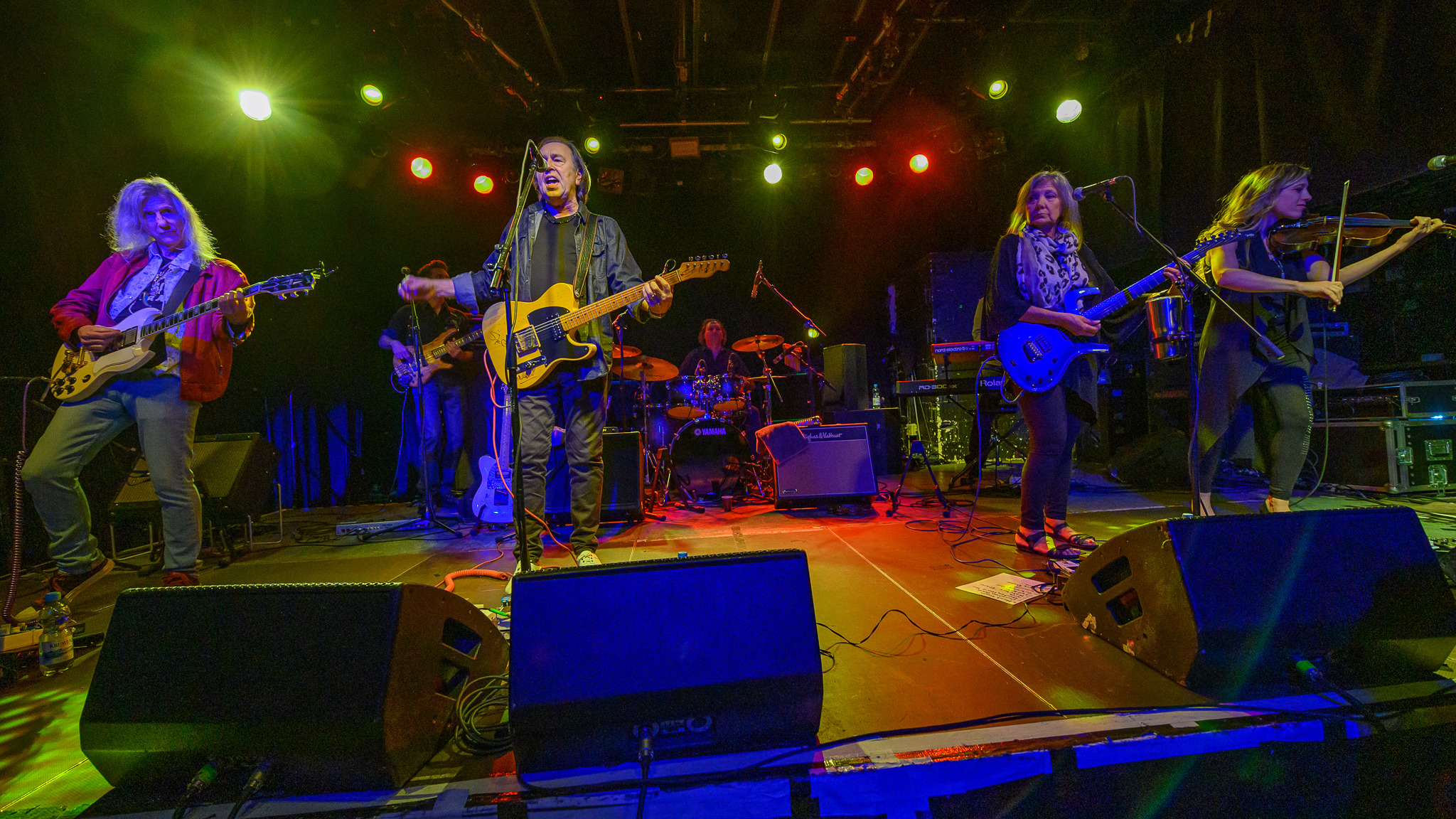
- Pavlov's Dog in 2019.

Background information
- Origin: St. Louis, Missouri, U.S.
- Genres: Progressive rock; AOR
- Years active: 1972–1977; 1990; 2004; 2005–present
- Labels: ABC; Columbia; Telectro
- Members: Abbie (Hainz) Steiling; Rick Steiling; Mark Maher; Steve Bunck
- Past members: Mike Safron; Doug Rayburn; Rick Stockton; David Hamilton; Siegfried Carver; Steve Levin; Steve Scorfina; Tom Nickeson; Kirk Sarkisian; Nick Schleuter; Bill Franco; Bill Costello; Randy Hetlage; Ray Schulte; Andrea Young; Royal Robbins; David Karns; Nick Shifeton; Michael McElvain; Timothy Duggen; Nathan Jatcko; Amanda McCoy; Manfred Ploetz; David Malachowski; Sara Surkamp; David Surkamp
- Website: pavlovsdog.band

Pavlov's Dog is a 1970s progressive rock/AOR band formed in St. Louis, Missouri, in 1972. The name is a reference to the animal(s) used by Ivan Pavlov in his experimentation into classical conditioning.

== History ==
=== Early years and split ===
The original lineup of Pavlov's Dog included vocalist David Surkamp, guitarist Steve Levin, keyboardists David Hamilton and Doug Rayburn, bassist Rick Stockton, drummer Mike Safron, and violinist Siegfried Carver (born Richard Nadler).

Levin left the band during their inaugural year and was replaced by Steve Scorfina, formerly of REO Speedwagon. Following the release of the band's debut album, Pampered Menial, Carver also departed.

Pampered Menial had an unusual release history: it was briefly issued on ABC Records in 1975 before being quickly re-released by Columbia Records, resulting in two versions appearing in stores at the same time. The album was produced by Sandy Pearlman and Murray Krugman, who were also known for producing Blue Öyster Cult.

For their second album At the Sound of the Bell (1976), Tom Nickeson was added to the line-up on guitar; he switched to keyboards following the departure of Hamilton. A raft of guest artists contributed to the album, including jazz saxophonist Michael Brecker and Roxy Music's Andy Mackay. Bill Bruford played the drums on this album, due to the absence of Safron, and when Safron did not receive a promised credit on the album sleeve, he departed the band permanently and was replaced by Kirk Sarkisian. This line-up of the band remained until their dissolution in 1977.

The band recorded a third album in 1977, but due to poor sales of the first two albums, Columbia refused to release it, hastening the band's split. The third album appeared as a bootleg in the 1980s, a limited edition pressed from stolen master tapes. It was released under the name The St. Louis Hounds, without Pavlov's Dog being credited on the sleeve. The third album finally was titled Has Anyone Here Seen Sigfried?, remastered, appended with 10 bonus tracks of unreleased material from the 1970s, and released legally in 2007 by German label Rockville Music. The German label TRC bootlegged the album, under the title Third, but this version does not include the bonus tracks.

When the band split up in the late 1970s, Surkamp was rumored to be dead, although in fact he was working with Ian Matthews on a band named Hi-Fi. While living in Seattle, this group was successful on the club scene and recorded a 5-track live 12" EP in 1981 entitled Hi-Fi Demonstration Record, a studio album in 1983 entitled Moods for Mallards, and a Christmas single "It's Almost Christmas". Records were released on the First American label and distribution was mostly limited to the Pacific Northwest. Label owner Jerry Dennon got into legal trouble with the US Justice Department as part of a master tape tax shelter scam. He pled guilty to tax fraud in May 1985, while continuing to proclaim his innocence.

=== Reformation and return to music ===
In 1990, Surkamp and Rayburn reformed the band and recorded Lost in America for US label Telectro Records, which was re-released worldwide by Rockville Music in 2007, after TRC had also bootlegged it in the late 1990s. Scorfina performed on some of the sessions for this album.

On June 26, 2004, a reunion concert featuring Surkamp, Safron, Rayburn, Stockton, Hamilton, and Scorfina took place in St. Louis, and in 2005 Surkamp and Safron reformed the band with Surkamp's wife, Sara, on vocals and guitar, Ray Schulte on lead guitar, Royal Robbins on keyboards, Tim Duggen on bass, and Andrea Young on violin. This line-up toured Europe annually in 2005 and 2006, playing the 2006 Arrow Rock Festival in the Netherlands in front of 54,000 people.

After the 2006 tour, Schulte, Robbins and Duggen were replaced, and the new line-up was then: David Surkamp (vocals and guitar), Mike Safron (drums), Sara Surkamp (vocals and guitar), "Bongo" Bill Costello (mellotron), Bill Franco (lead guitar), David Karns (bass), Michael McElvain (keyboards) and Andrea Young (violin). This line-up played two tours in 2007, including the first tours in Greece and Crete in March 2007, and then touring Europe in the summer of 2007 playing venues such as Spirit of 66 in Verviers, BE as well as headlining both the Burg Herzberg Festival in 2007 (25,000 people). This coincided with the 2007 release of a solo album by Surkamp, Dancing on the Edge of a Teacup, by Rockville Music. The Burg Herzberg performance had also been filmed and recorded, but has not been released in any but bootlegged formats.

In 2008, David Karns, Bill Franco, Michael McElvain and Andrea Young were unable to return due to previous commitments (Karns and Franco playing with Anthony Gomes, Young playing with the Reverse Cowgirls and McElvain finishing his graduate music studies). To fill the spots, the Surkamps hired Phil Gomez (keyboards), Randy Hetlage (lead guitar), Abbie Hainz Steiling (violin), and saw the return of Rayburn, playing bass. This lineup again toured throughout Europe in 2008 playing many venues as well as the Woodstock Festival in Dornstadt (Germany) in 2008 (5,000 people).

In 2009 Doug Rayburn was unable to return, and Rick Steiling was brought in on bass. Also not returning were Phil Gomez and Randy Hetlage. Bill Franco was asked back on lead guitar and Nick Schlueter was brought in to handle keyboards and mellotron parts, reducing the lineup to seven members. This lineup toured Europe from 2009 through 2012, playing its most extensive tours to date including the band's first dates in the U.K. and the Fiesta City Festival in Verviers, BE in 2012, sharing the stage with the legendary Blues Brothers Band (Steve Cropper, "Blue" Lou Marini, Donald "Duck" Dunn, et al.). During this time, Pavlov's Dog recorded two shows in 2009 (Augsberg and Karlsruhe, the latter filmed), with the Augsberg show being released for the album Live and Unleashed. Also released was the studio album Echo & Boo in 2010.

Bill Franco exited the band in May 2013, and after auditions, Amanda McCoy was brought in on lead guitar. Pavlov's Dog again toured Europe in 2013, backing a re-release of Has Anyone Here Seen Sigfried? with the addition of live bonus tracks of the band with the lineups from 2007, 2011 and 2012. There was no Pavlov's Dog tour in 2014, though David and Sara Surkamp went on a brief solo acoustic tour in the U.K. and Germany. During this time, Nick Schlueter exited the band, and after auditions, Nathan Jatcko was brought in on keyboards for the 2015 tour through Europe.

The Pekin Tapes, a collection of demos recorded in Pekin, Illinois, in 1973, was assembled from master tapes and released in 2014, also by Rockville Records. It was intended to be the band's official debut album until ABC made them record Pampered Menial. The tapes were lost when the studio burned down, but surviving copies were discovered in a private inheritance.

Siegfried Carver died on May 30, 2009; he was 60 years old. Doug Rayburn died on September 21, 2012. Stockton died on February 17, 2015. Nathan Jatcko, the latter day keyboardist with the band, committed suicide on January 17, 2018. On January 31, 2021, the band announced the death of their former drummer and manager Manfred Ploetz. On October 3, 2022, the death of lead guitarist David Malachowski was announced. Subsequently, the "Hair of the Dog" 2022 fall tour which was to start in the same month in Europe, was postponed. David Hamilton died on June 20, 2025, at the age of 74, and Sara Surkamp died on November 25, 2025, at the age of 72. David Surkamp died on October 13, 2026, at the age of 73.

== Band members ==
Current members

- Abbie (Hainz) Steiling – violin, mandolin (2008–present)
- Rick Steiling – bass (2009, 2011–present)
- Mark Maher – keyboards (2018–present)
- Steve Bunck – drums (2019–present)

Former members

- Mike Safron – drums (1972–1976, 2004, 2005–2014)
- Doug Rayburn – keyboards, flute, percussion, bass (1972–1977, 1990, 2004, 2005–2008; died 2012)
- Rick Stockton – bass (1972–1977, 2004; died 2015)
- David Hamilton – keyboards (1972–1976, 2004, 2024; died 2025)
- Siegfried Carver – violin, viola (1972–1975; died 2009)
- Steve Levin – lead guitar (1972)
- Steve Scorfina – lead guitar (1972–1977, 2004)
- Tom Nickeson – keyboards, guitar (1976-1977)
- Kirk Sarkisian – drums (1976–1977)
- Ray Schulte – lead guitar (2005–2006)
- Timothy Duggen – bass (2005–2006)
- Andrea Young – violin (2005–2007)
- Royal Robbins – keyboards (2005–2006)
- "Bongo" Bill Costello – mellotron (2006–2009)
- David Karns – bass (2006–2007)
- Bill Franco – lead guitar (2006–2007, 2009–2013)
- Michael McElvain – keyboards (2007)
- Randy Hetlage – lead guitar (2008)
- Nick Schlueter – keyboards (2009–2013)
- David Surkamp – vocals, guitar (1972–1977, 1990, 2004, 2005–2026, died 2026)
- Amanda McCoy – lead guitar (2013–2017)
- Nathan Jatcko – keyboards (2015–2018; died 2018)
- Manfred Ploetz – drums (2010, 2013–2018; died 2021)
- David Malachowski – lead guitar (2018–2022, died 2022)
- Sara Surkamp – vocals, guitar (2005–2025, died 2025)

== Discography ==
=== Studio albums ===
- Pampered Menial (1975) - AUS No. 23
- At the Sound of the Bell (1976) - AUS No. 37
- Lost in America (1990)
- Has Anyone Here Seen Sigfried? (bootlegged in 1977, officially released in 2007)
- Echo & Boo (2010)
- The Pekin Tapes (2014)
- Prodigal Dreamer (2018)
- Wonderlust (2025)

=== Live albums ===
- Live and Unleashed (2011)
- House Broken (2016, DVD/CD)

=== Compilations ===
- The Best of Pavlov's Dog (1995)
- Pavlov's Dog Essential Recordings 1974-2018 (2024)

=== Singles ===
Year	Single	Chart Positions	
Year	Single	US	AUS
1975	"Julia" / "Episode"	-	79
1975	"Song Dance" / "Natchez Trace"	-	-
