= Ambassador Theatre (St. Louis) =

Former movie theater in St. Louis

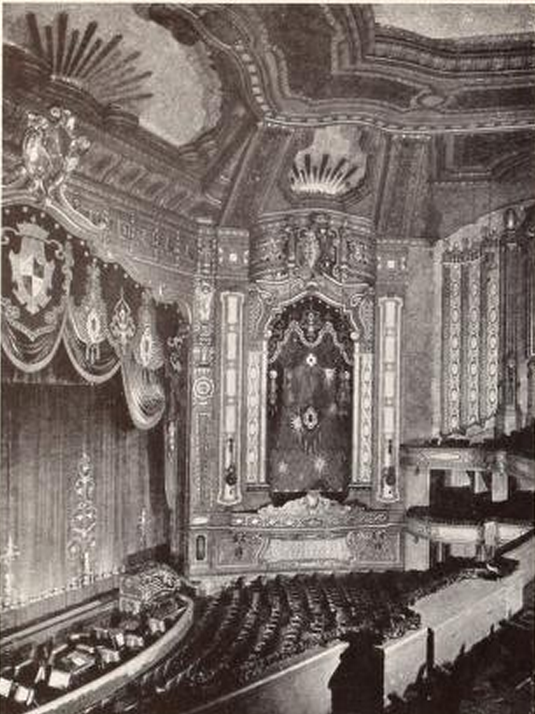
- Interactive map of Ambassador Theatre
- Address: 411 N. 7th Street; St. Louis, Missouri 63101; United States
- Capacity: 3,000
- Current use: Razed

Construction
- Opened: 1926
- Closed: 1997
- Architect: Rapp & Rapp
- Ambassador Theater Building
- U.S. National Register of Historic Places
- St. Louis Landmark
- Location within Missouri Location within the United States
- Location: 411 N. 7th St., St. Louis, Missouri
- Coordinates: 38°37′45″N 90°11′29″W
- Area: less than one acre
- Built: 1925
- Architect: Rapp and Rapp
- Architectural style: Late 19th And 20th Century Revivals
- Demolished: 1997
- NRHP reference No.: 83001039
- Added to NRHP: March 29, 1983

The Ambassador Theatre was a lavish movie palace-type theater in St. Louis, Missouri, designed by the architectural firm of Rapp and Rapp. A landmark of rococo 1920s theater design, it opened in 1926 and was demolished in 1997.

== Origins ==
As early as January 1925, the St. Louis Post-Dispatch mentioned plans for a 22-story office building containing a Skouras Brothers theater. The entire structure was to cost $2.5 million. What was eventually constructed was a 17-story building, with a 3,000-seat theater—designed by Rapp & Rapp—occupying the first six stories. The theater cost $5 million and the organ alone cost $115,000. The grand opening was held on August 26, 1926, and the Ambassador welcomed 2.6 million patrons in its first year.

The Skouras Brothers Co, Spyros Skouras, George Skouras and Charles Skouras, whose dream of building a world-class movie palace in downtown St. Louis was realized in 1926 when the $5.5 million Ambassador Theatre Building opened on prime real estate at the northwest corner of Locust and Seventh streets. The 17-story structure which housed the luxurious cinema also added a tall office block to the city's skyline. Less than two decades earlier the three Skouras brothers arrived in St. Louis from their native Greece to become the results of rags to riches Hollywood success stories.

== Design ==
The Skourases chose Rapp & Rapp, Chicago's famed theater architects, to design the 3,000-seat Ambassador. The firm's local debut, the St. Louis Theater (now Powell Symphony Hall), was completed in 1925 on Grand Boulevard. In addition to Windy City achievements such as the Chicago, Southtown, and Uptown theaters, the brothers C. W. and George Rapp drew up plans in the 1920s for notable theater-skyscraper hybrids that included New York City's 29-story Paramount (1926); Cleveland's 21-story Palace (1922); and the 22-story Oriental in Chicago whose top stories housed the Masonic Lodge halls.

In the Ambassador, Rapp & Rapp expanded the firm's typical Louis XIV Sun King style, a rendition of French Renaissance/Baroque motifs for which they were best-known. The architects crowned the Ambassador with a distinctive cornice frieze of terra cotta griffins—a motif also displayed in two prominent New York skyscrapers of the period. Gazing across the rooftops, the griffins were well-placed as traditional guardians of treasure in antiquity. The planar quality of the cornice and flattened treatment of the griffins suggest the influence of modernist trends. The cornice marked a departure from older style. more elaborated cornices of high relief, often punctuated by lion heads.

To announce the theatre portion of the tall Ambassador Building, Rapp and Rapp designed a monumental arcade of giant windows along Locust Street, wrapping the corner of Seventh. Thirty feet high, these windows were richly embellished with finely detailed terra cotta in Renaissance style. Highly modeled theater masks of comedy and tragedy were featured on cartouche pier and spandrel panels. The three floors of theater offices fronting Seventh Street were appropriately distinguished by terra cotta spandrel panels featuring regal pairs of sphinxes, Egyptian symbols of power.

== Demise ==
The theater closed in 1997 and was demolished. Some important architectural elements were preserved by the National Building Arts Center.
