= Charles Skouras =

Greek-American film executive (1889–1954)

Charles P. Skouras (/ˈskʊərəs/; Greek: Κάρολος Σκούρας; 1889–1954) was an American movie executive and president of Fox West Coast, born in Skourohorion, Greece. He and his two brothers, George Skouras and Spyros Skouras, came from Greece as poor sons of a sheep herder who rose to become top movie executives.

Survived by his grandson, Charles P. Skouras III a film and television producer known for shows such as Desperate Housewives and iconic films including The Abyss, Free Willy, and That Thing You Do. His great-grandson Charles P. Skouras IV is an entertainment agent at the Murtha Skouras Agency, representing multiple award-winning producers, cinematographers, production designers, and editors for film and television.

== Life and career ==
The Skouras brothers arrived in St. Louis in 1908–11 from Greece. Living frugally on wages as busboys and bartenders in downtown hotels, they pooled their savings of $3500 in 1914 and in partnership with two other Greeks, they constructed a modest nickelodeon at 1420 Market Street on the site of today's Kiel Opera House. This initial property, named the Olympia, was quickly followed by the acquisition of other theaters.

The brothers incorporated in 1924 with $400,000 capital stock. By then more than thirty local theaters belonged to the Skouras Brothers Co. of St. Louis. The biggest moment for the Skouras empire came when their dream of building a world-class movie palace in downtown St. Louis was grandly realized in 1926 when the $5.5 million Ambassador Theatre Building opened (this theater re-opened in 1939 as the New Fox Theatre). In 1928 the brothers sold their theatre chain to Warner Brothers but continued to manage the theatres. Following the Wall Street crash of 1929, they lost their fortune.

In 1931, they acquired a bankrupt theatre chain in New York and became successful again. In 1933, Charles moved to Los Angeles and assumed control of Fox West-Coast Theatres. In 1942, he became president of National Theatres.

In 1946, Charles was paid the highest salary in the United States with a salary of $985,300 and was tops again in 1949 with $975,000. In a late 1950s suit, Goldwyn claimed that Twentieth Century-Fox, Fox West Coast Theatres, National Theatres, Charles P. Skouras, and several affiliated circuits including T & D Junior Enterprises had intentionally discriminated against independently produced films (that is, made outside of the studio production systems), and he sought compensation for years of perceived oppression. Charles died before the trial took place.

When Charles and his brothers were still trying to get ahead in Hollywood, he made a vow to God that he would build a majestic cathedral if God would grant him success in show biz. Charlie Skouras got his wish. He went on to become the head of National Theatres and a man of his word, built the Saint Sophia church in 1952 at a cost of $2 million, in what was then the Greek section of Los Angeles.

In recognition, he was made Knight Commander of the Order of the Phoenix of Greece in 1952.

Skouras first suffered a heart attack in January 1953 and again in October 1953. On Sunday, October 17, 1954, he suffered another attack, his fifth and died at Cedars of Lebanon hospital in Hollywood on October 22. The funeral service was held at the church he built.
