= Charles M. Bair =

American businessman and sheep rancher

Charles M. Bair (1857–1943) was an early railroading businessman who also became one of the largest sheep ranchers in the United States. He had two daughters, Alberta (1895–1993) and Marguerite (1889–1976).

Charles M. Bair was born in Stark County, Ohio. He moved to Montana Territory in 1883 to become a conductor for the Northern Pacific Railway. By 1886, Bair was working out of Helena, Montana. On Christmas Eve of that year, he married Mary Jacobs in Chicago, Illinois and brought her back to Helena, where they lived until 1891. Their first daughter, Marguerite, was born on July 1, 1889, during their stay in Helena. In 1891, he left the railroad and Helena to become a sheep rancher near Lavina, Montana.

Bair relocated to what is now downtown Billings, Montana, in 1893. Mary Bair, Charles' wife, gave birth to their youngest daughter, Alberta, at that homestead on July 15, 1895. A theater, originally named the Fox Theater, was renamed the Alberta Bair Theater in honor of Alberta in 1987.

In 1898, he sold his flock and went to Alaska, where he became a millionaire selling machinery to miners participating in the Klondike Gold Rush. Later, he returned to Montana and sheep ranching in Martinsdale. In 1910, he owned about 300,000 head of sheep and was reputed to have the largest sheep operation in North America.

Following the oil strike in 1916 at Lost Soldier Dome in Wyoming, Bair was among several entrepreneurs to travel to the region to stake an oil claim. The site he claimed grew into a small oil town that was afterward named Bairoil, Wyoming.

Bair died in 1943. His family home in Martinsdale is now a museum. A trust fund was set up in his name by daughters, Marguerite and Alberta. Part of the trust is used to fund scholarships for high school graduates of Meagher and Wheatland Counties. Bair was inducted into the Montana Cowboy Hall of Fame in 2008.
