= Skypoint =

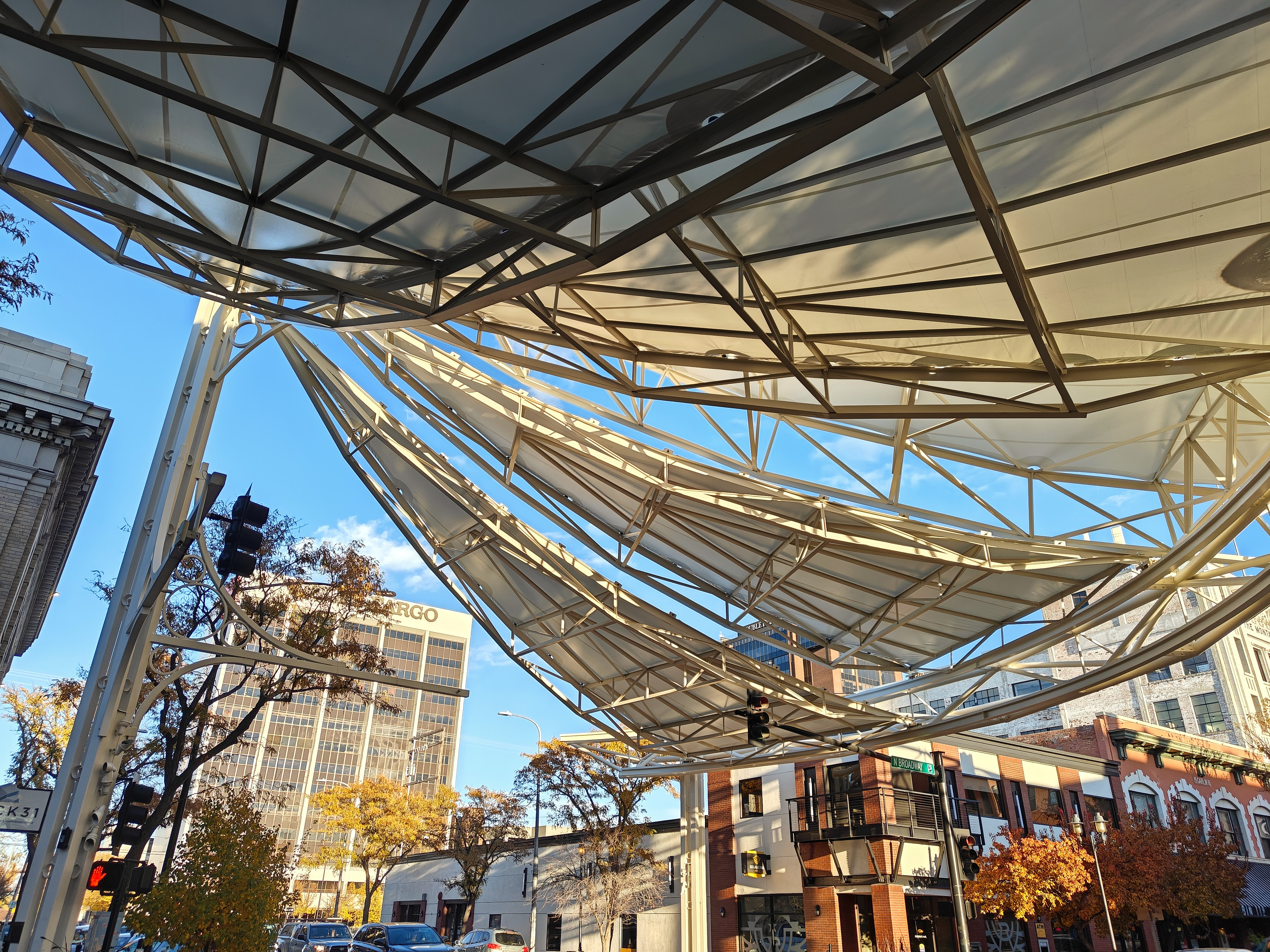
- The Skypoint structure in downtown Billings, 2025

- Completion date: April 2002
- Location: Billings, MT
- Coordinates: 45°46′59″N 108°30′24″W

Skypoint is a tent-like structure over the intersection of 2nd Avenue and Broadway in downtown Billings, Montana. Its highest point is 73 feet (22 m) above ground level. There are five "sails" that make up the structure. The largest sail stays in place while the four smaller ones can move on a track and "stack" under the large one to let the sun through or to cover the intersection if it rains. Skypoint is part of the plan to revitalize downtown Billings and attract more people to downtown.

Skypoint was completed in 2002 and was originally named the "Defining Element" until it got its current name in a naming contest. It was built as a new icon for the city of Billings and to hold events such as the Strawberry festival, the Christmas Stroll, and other events.

== Structure statistics ==
- Tallest column: 73 feet (22 m)
- 2 Shortest columns: 28 feet (8.5 m)
- Sails: 5
- Completed: April 2002
- Dedicated: May 2002
