= Skouras Brothers Enterprises =

American movie theater chain

The Skouras Brothers Enterprises Inc. was an American movie theater chain from the early days of film-making based in St. Louis, Missouri. It was owned and operated by three brothers: Charles, Spyros and George. Even though it never became as important and famous as other family based companies, like the Warner Brothers, its members came to play important roles in American film industry.

== History ==
The Skouras brothers arrived in St. Louis in 1910 from Greece. Living frugally on wages as busboys and bartenders in downtown hotels, they pooled their savings of $3500 in 1914 and in partnership with two other Greeks, they constructed a modest nickelodeon (movie theater) at 1420 Market Street on the site of today's Peabody Opera House. This initial property, named the Olympia, was quickly followed by the acquisition of other theaters.

The brothers incorporated in 1924 with $400,000 capital stock. By then more than thirty local theaters belonged to the Skouras Brothers Co. of St. Louis. The biggest moment for the Skouras empire came when their dream of building a world-class movie palace in downtown St. Louis was grandly realized in 1926 when the $5.5 million Ambassador Theatre Building opened. The Ambassador Theatre operated through the 1970s and was demolished in 1996. U.S. Bank Plaza was built in its place.

During the depression the company encountered financial trouble. Like many other movie and theater moguls the Skouras Brothers were fighting for their survival. In 1928, control of the Skouras Brothers Enterprises, Inc., and the St. Louis Amusement Company was acquired by Warner Brothers Pictures, Inc. and the brothers joined the film company as managers of film production. On January 24, 1931, the Skouras Brothers resigned from Warner Brothers.

Spyros Skouras became in 1942 president of 20th Century Fox. During Skouras' tenure (which was the longest in the company's history) he worked to rescue the faltering movie industry from television's lure. 20th Century Fox's famous advertising slogan, Movies are Better than Ever, gained credibility in 1953 when Spyros introduced Cinemascope in the studio's groundbreaking feature film The Robe. With his introduction of Cinemascope, Skouras did much to save the movie industry from its newly invented competitor, television.

Charles Skouras became president of Fox Coast West. In a late 1950s suit, Samuel Goldwyn claimed that Twentieth Century-Fox, Fox West Coast Theatres, National Theatres, Charles P. Skouras, and several affiliated circuits including T & D. Junior Enterprises had intentionally discriminated against independently produced films, and he sought compensation for years of perceived oppression. Charles died before the trial took place.

George Skouras became president of United Artists Theatres. In 1952 George joined United Artists with Michael Todd and Joe Schenck, former president of Twentieth Century Fox, in order to form the Magna Theatre Corporation for production and distribution of Todd-AO films.
