= Lost in America (Pavlov's Dog album) =

Studio album by Pavlov's Dog
- Released: 1990
- Studios: Douglas Rayburn Studio, Benton Park, St. Louis; Breezeway Recording Studios, Waukesha, Wisconsin
- Genres: AOR; progressive rock
- Length: 43:02
- Label: TelectrO Records
- Producers: David Surkamp, Douglas Rayburn

Pavlov's Dog chronology
At the Sound of the Bell (1976)	Lost in America (1990)	The Best of Pavlov's Dog (1995)

Audio sample
- "Lost in America": file; help

Professional ratings
Review scores
Source	Rating
DMME	3/5 stars
The Great Rock Bible	5/10 stars
Rocktimes	favorable

Lost in America is the third studio album by American progressive rock/AOR band Pavlov's Dog, released in 1990. The band had been disbanded in 1977, but reformed in 1990 and recorded the album with only two original members, frontman David Surkamp and multi-instrumentalist Douglas Rayburn. The band's original guitarist, Steve Scorfina, and former percussionist, Kirk Sarkisian, appear as guest musicians.

== Track listing ==
All tracks are credited to David Surkamp and Douglas Rayburn.

No.	Title	Length
1.	"Lost in America"	3:59
2.	"A Hardly Innocent Mind"	4:49
3.	"Don't Rain on Me"	3:47
4.	"Not by My Side"	3:07
5.	"Pantomime"	5:22
6.	"Breaking Ice"	4:34
7.	"You & I"	3:38
8.	"All Night"	3:22
9.	"As Lovers Do"	4:48
10.	"Brown Eyes"	5:42
Total length:		43:08

2007 Rockville Music reissue bonus tracks
No.	Title	Writer(s)	Length
11.	"Late November" (Originally from Pampered Menial, recorded live on Lost in America Tour 1990)	Steve Scorfina, David Surkamp	3:21
12.	"You & I" (Recorded live on Lost in America Tour 1990)	David Surkamp, Douglas Rayburn	4:17
13.	"Brown Eyes" (Recorded live on Lost in America Tour 1990)	David Surkamp, Douglas Rayburn	5:44
14.	"Theme from Subway Sue" (Originally from Pampered Menial, recorded live on Lost in America Tour 1990, performed unplugged by David Surkamp and Douglas Rayburn)	David Surkamp	4:13
15.	"If We Never Meet Again" (Reckless Sleepers cover, recorded live on European Tour 2005, performed unplugged by David Surkamp and Sara Surkamp)	Jules Shear	3:04
16.	"Angels Twilight Jump" (Previously unreleased, recorded live on European Tour 2005)	David Surkamp	6:22
17.	"Suzanne, I Love You" (Previously unreleased, recorded live on European Tour 2006, performed unplugged by David Surkamp)	David Surkamp	4:30
18.	"Don't Rain On Me" (Recorded live on European Tour 2006, performed unplugged by David Surkamp and Sara Surkamp)	David Surkamp, Douglas Rayburn	4:36

== Personnel ==
All information is presented according to the 2007 Rockville Music reissue liner notes.

Pavlov's Dog

- David Surkamp: vocals, guitar, twelve-string guitar
- Douglas Rayburn: keyboards
- Michele Isam: vocals, saxophone
- Robert Lloyd: bass guitar
- Frank Kriege: drums

Guest Musicians

- Steve Scorfina: acoustic guitar on Lost in America and As Lovers Do
- Kirk Sarkisian: drum treatments, additional percussion
- Merry Adams: backing vocals on Brown Eyes
- Lesslie Martin: power chords on Don't Rain on Me

Production

- David Surkamp: direction, production
- Douglas Rayburn: direction, production, recording engineering, audio mixing
- Roby Petit: direction
- Kurt Bujack: audio mixing, mixing engineering
- Jim Loyd: mastering
- Kathy Bosch: additional recording engineering
- Patty Bosch: additional recording engineering
- Steve Gotzier: additional recording engineering

Artwork

- Bill Looderhose: cover art
- Eugen Kern-Emden: art production
- Steve Martin: photography
