= At the Sound of the Bell =

Studio album by Pavlov's Dog
- Released: April 1976
- Recorded: October 1975
- Studios: Record Plant, New York City
- Genres: Progressive rock; art rock
- Length: 33:28
- Label: CBS
- Producers: Sandy Pearlman, Murray Krugman

Pavlov's Dog chronology
Pampered Menial (1975)	At the Sound of the Bell (1976)	Lost in America (1990)

Audio sample
- "Valkerie": file; help

Professional ratings
Review scores
Source	Rating
AllMusic	4.5/5 stars
DMME	4.5/5 stars
The Great Rock Bible	8/10 stars
Mojo	favorable
Prog	4/5 stars

At the Sound of the Bell is the second studio album by American progressive rock/AOR band Pavlov's Dog, released in 1976.

Since the previous year's album Pampered Menial, violinist Siegfried Carver and drummer Mike Safron had left the band, being replaced by guitarist Thomas Nickeson and drummer Bill Bruford. Bruford, already famous as a member of Yes, King Crimson and Genesis, joined as a session musician. Several other musicians performed as guests, most notably Grammy Awarded Michael Brecker, Andy Mackay of Roxy Music fame, and guitarist Elliott Randall.

The album's cover depicts model Michael Mantel dressed as the Hunchback of Notre-Dame.

According to lead singer David Surkamp, "the band was falling apart" during the album's recording, as the members "were all wanting to be songwriters but none of them could write" except for himself and Doug Rayburn. The band broke up in 1977.

== Track listing ==
All tracks credited to David Surkamp, except where noted. All information according to original vinyl liner notes.

No.	Title	Writer(s)	Length
1.	"She Came Shining"	Surkamp, Doug Rayburn	4:24
2.	"Standing Here with You (Megan's Song)"		3:47
3.	"Mersey"	Surkamp, Steve Scorfina	3:03
4.	"Valkerie"		5:22
5.	"Try to Hang On"		2:08
6.	"Gold Nuggets"		3:25
7.	"She Breaks Like a Morning Sky"	Surkamp, Rayburn	2:22
8.	"Early Morning On"	Surkamp, Rayburn	3:21
9.	"Did You See Him Cry"	Surkamp, Rayburn	5:36
Total length:			33:28

2009 Rockville Music reissue bonus tracks
No.	Title	Length
10.	"Gold Nuggets" (Live at Burg-Herzberg-Festival 2007)	4:38
11.	"Standing Here with You (Megan's Song)" (Live at Ford Auditorium 1976)	4:07
12.	"Try to Hang On" (Live at Ford Auditorium 1976)	3:12

== Charts ==
Chart (1976)	Peak Position
Australia (Kent Music Report)	37

== Personnel ==
Pavlov's Dog (in album liner notes order)

- David Surkamp: vocals, acoustic guitar, Veleno guitar
- Doug Rayburn: mellotron, bass guitar, percussion
- Steve Scorfina: lead guitar
- David Hamilton: keyboards
- Rick Stockton: Fender bass guitar
- Thomas Nickeson: acoustic guitar
- Bill Bruford: drums (as session musician)

Guest Musicians (in alphabetical order)

- Mike Abene: organ
- Michael Brecker: saxophone
- George Gerich: organ
- Andy Mackay: saxophone
- Les Nicol: guitar
- Paul Prestopino: mandolin
- Elliott Randall: guitar
- Gavyn Wright: violin
- High Wycombe Boys Choir: vocals
- Mountain Fjord Orchestra: strings

Production

- Sandy Pearlman: producer
- Murray Krugman: producer
- John Jansen: recording engineer
- Sam Ginsberg: assistant recording engineer
- Will Reid-Dick: assistant mixing engineer

Artwork

- John Berg: designer
- Andy Engel: designer
- Jerry Abramowitz: photographer
- Michael Mantel: model
- Bob O'Bradovich: make-up artist
