= Ford Auditorium =

Former multi-use auditorium and theater in Detroit, Michigan, United States

Coordinates: 42.3278°N 83.0430°W

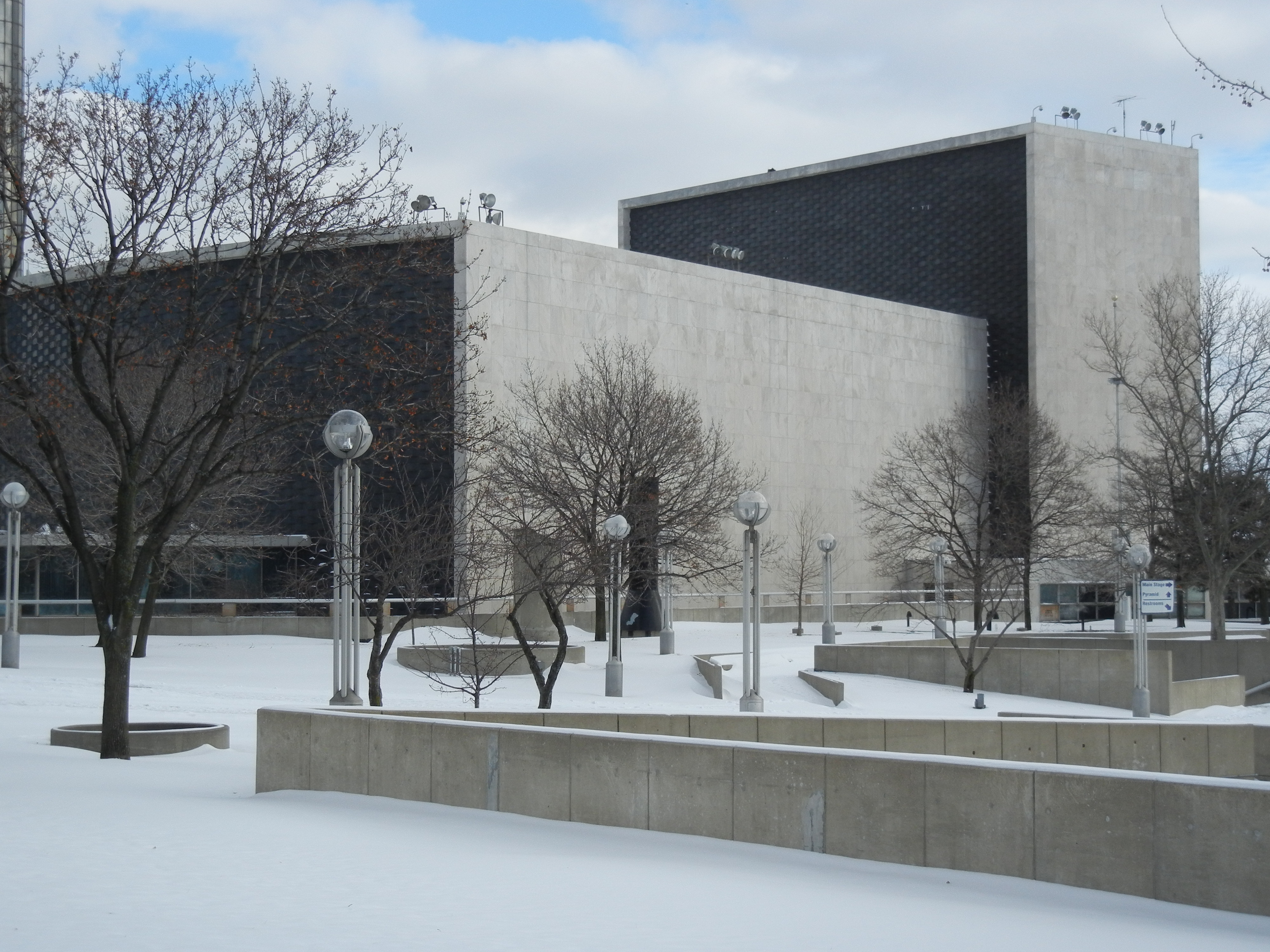
Ford Auditorium from Hart Plaza

Ford Auditorium was a 2,920-seat auditorium in Detroit, Michigan built in 1955 and opened in 1956. Located on the Detroit riverfront, it served as a home to the Detroit Symphony Orchestra (DSO) for more than 33 years and was an integral part of the city's Civic Center. With approval from the Ford family and the city, the building was demolished in July 2011 as part of the city's waterfront redesign plans.

== History ==
The auditorium was financed by the Ford Motor Company and contributions of the Ford affiliated dealers in the U.S. Ford gave its approval when the city planned to remove the building as part of the waterfront redesign plans. The project received such a large donation from the Ford family, it was designed as a memorial to Henry and Edsel Ford. When the auditorium opened, it became home for the DSO and hosted conventions, pop concerts, theatrical productions and speeches. The building had outlived its usefulness to the city and was replaced by other facilities. The building acoustics were also not considered satisfactory.

The building was designed by the firm of O'Dell, Hewlett and Luckenbach in the modern style. It was situated at the base of a U-shaped drive named Auditorium Drive. Beneath the drive and adjacent landscaped areas is a two-level parking garage containing 750-spaces. The garage was accessed via ramps in the median of Jefferson Avenue and had a pedestrian entrance which provided direct access to the lower-level lounge of the auditorium.

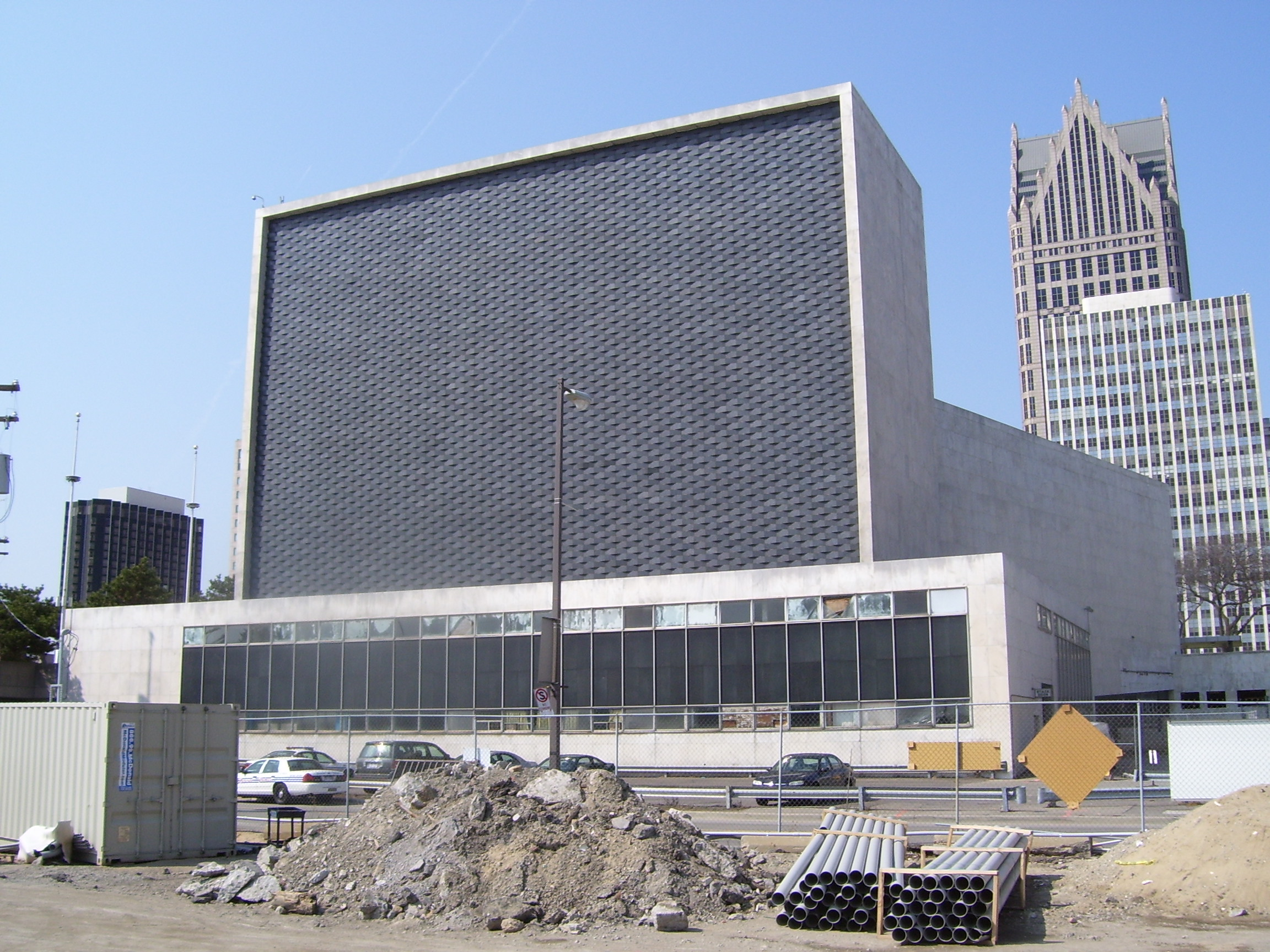
The Ford Auditorium as it appeared in March 2011, from the rear

The exterior shape of the building followed the form of its interior spaces with backstage and audience areas clearly visible. The sides of the building were clad in white marble to harmonize with the other buildings in the Civic Center Complex- the City-County Building, Veterans Memorial Building and Cobo Hall and Arena. The Jefferson Avenue and river facades were covered with a mica-flecked blue granite in a basket-weave pattern.

In the curved foyer of the main level were three sculptures by local artist Marshall Fredericks. On the curved wall above the main entrance was a 120-foot mural made of steel, copper and aluminum wire entitled Ford Empire depicting the Ford Rouge Complex. Above the stairs to the balcony at the east end of the lobby was a piece entitled Harlequins, Ballerina and Orchestral Parade and above the west stairs was another piece entitled Harlequins and Circus Parade. The Ford Empire mural was moved to storage in 2003 and in 2007, the Marshall Fredericks Sculpture Museum at Saginaw Valley State University negotiated with the City of Detroit to have the two smaller pieces moved there.

On February 14, 1965, the auditorium served as the stage for Malcolm X to deliver his last speech outside of New York before his murder. He delivered his "Last Message" at the First Annual Dignity Projection and Scholarship Awards ceremony despite the firebombing of his Queens, New York home by the Nation of Islam that morning.

=== Demolition ===
Ford Auditorium was demolished in July 2011 at a cost of $754,000 as part of the city's waterfront redesign plans.

Demolition of the Ford Auditorium began on July 9, 2011, after being delayed a month because the city found more asbestos than expected.

== Facilities ==
=== Recording system ===
When first opened, the auditorium had a state-of-the-art recording system, and the Detroit Symphony Orchestra under Paul Paray made a number of recordings in the venue for Mercury Records. But it was also considered a very "dead" hall, with poor acoustics that resisted repeated attempts at improvement. After much discussion, the DSO returned to its former home, Orchestra Hall, in 1989. Ford Auditorium saw little activity thereafter, and by 1995, had stopped accepting reservations for use of its facilities.

=== Organs ===
According to the Aeolian-Skinner archives, the auditorium's large Aeolian-Skinner organ was still in the building as of 2006, but had been unused for some time. It was installed in 1957 at a cost of $100,000. Helderop Pipe Organs, along with a team of volunteers, began to dismantle the organ in late June 2011, and finished late July 4, 2011, the day before demolition was scheduled to begin. The city donated the organ to the congregation of nearby St. Aloysius Catholic Church, which took the 2,800-pipe instrument with the goal of operating it within two years.

A smaller 1,200-pipe organ which operated from the same console has been given to the DSO who will use it to perform 17th and 18th-century pieces in Orchestra Hall.
