= Nickelodeon (movie theater) =

Type of early movie theater

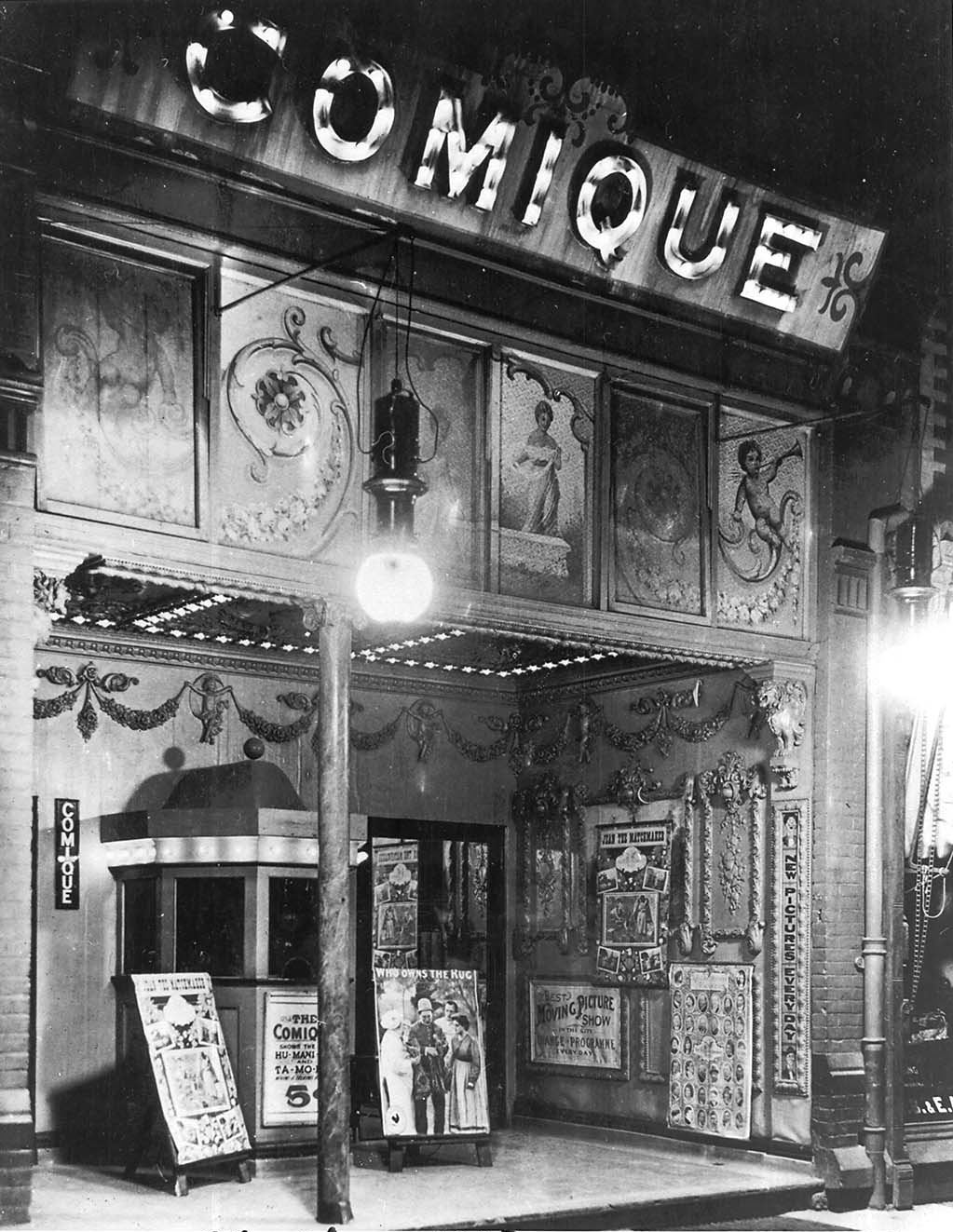
A nickelodeon theatre in Toronto, Ontario, Canada, c. 1910. Nickelodeons often used gaudy posters and ornamented facades to attract patrons, but bare walls and hard seats usually awaited within.

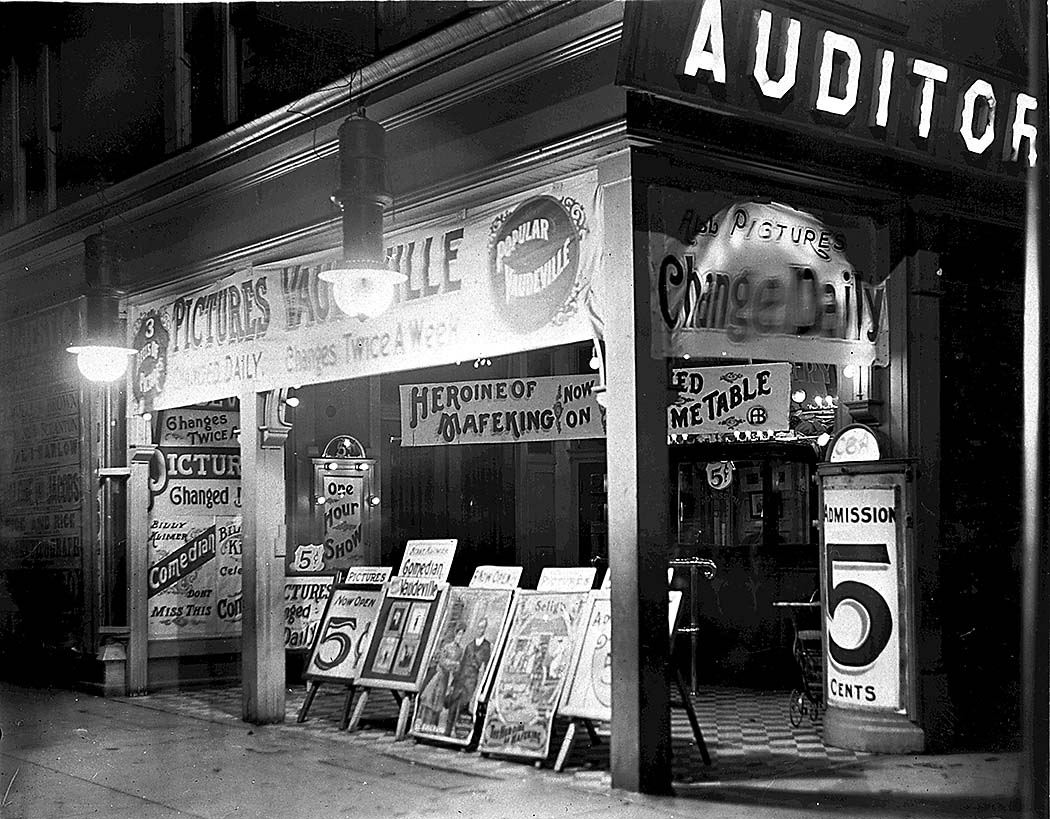
The Auditorium Theatre in 1910 at Toronto, Ontario, later renamed The Avenue Theatre in 1913 and The Mary Pickford Theatre in 1915

The nickelodeon was the first type of indoor exhibition space dedicated to showing projected motion pictures in the United States and Canada. Usually set up in converted storefronts, these small, simple theaters charged five cents for admission (a "nickel", hence the name) and flourished from about 1905 to 1915. American cable station Nickelodeon was named for these theaters.

== Etymology ==
The word nickelodeon is of two parts etymologically. The first part derives from nickel, which is the name of the U.S. five-cent coin. The second part derives from the ancient Greek word odeion, a roofed-over theater, indirectly by way of the Odéon in Paris, emblematic of a very large and luxurious theater, much as the Ritz was of a grand hotel.

== History ==
The earliest films had been shown in "peep show" machines or projected in vaudeville theaters as one of the otherwise live acts. Nickelodeons drastically altered film exhibition practices and the leisure-time habits of a large segment of the American public. Although they were characterized by continuous performances of a selection of short films, added attractions such as illustrated songs were sometimes an important feature. Regarded as disreputable and dangerous by some civic groups and municipal agencies, crude, ill-ventilated nickelodeons with hard wooden seats were outmoded as longer films became common and larger, more comfortably furnished motion-picture theaters were built, a trend that culminated in the lavish "movie palaces" of the 1920s.

Film historian Charles Musser wrote: "It is not too much to say that modern cinema began with the nickelodeons."

The name "Nickelodeon" was first used in 1888 by Colonel William Austin for his Austin's Nickelodeon, a dime museum located in Boston, Massachusetts.

Harry Davis, owner of the Nickelodeon on Smithfield Street in Pittsburgh, supposedly the first theater to progam exclusively moving pictures

The term was popularized by Harry Davis and John P. Harris. On June 19, 1905, they opened a small storefront theater with the name on Smithfield Street in Pittsburgh, Pennsylvania. Although it was not the first theater to show films, a 1919 news article claimed that it was the first theater in the world "devoted exclusively to exhibition of moving picture spectacles".

Davis and Harris found such great success with their operation that their concept of a five-cent theater showing movies continuously was soon imitated by hundreds of ambitious entrepreneurs, as was the name of the theater itself. Statistics at the time show that the number of nickelodeons in the United States doubled between 1907 and 1908 to around 8,000, and it was estimated that by 1910 as many as 26 million Americans visited these theaters weekly. Nickelodeons in converted storefronts typically seated fewer than 200 – the patrons often sat on hard wooden chairs, with the screen hung on the back wall. A piano (and maybe a drum set) would be placed to the side of, or below the screen. Larger nickelodeons sometimes had the capacity for well over 1,000 people.

In 1905, William Fox started his first nickelodeon in Brooklyn. He owned numerous theaters in New York and New Jersey.

In 1906, Carl Laemmle opened his first nickelodeon, The White Front on Milwaukee Avenue (Chicago) and a second one, The Family Theatre soon after.

In 1907, Louis B. Mayer renovated the Gem Theater in Haverhill, Massachusetts, converting it into a nickelodeon, which he opened as the Orpheum Theater, announcing that it would be "the home of refined entertainment devoted to Miles Brothers moving pictures and illustrated songs". Other well-known nickelodeon owners were the Skouras Brothers of St. Louis.

== Changes in film distribution and exhibition ==
Nickelodeons radically changed the modes of distribution and the types of films being made. Around 1903, longer multi-shot films became more prevalent, and this shift brought about important innovations in the distribution of films with the establishment of film exchanges. Film exchanges would buy films from manufacturers and then rent them out to exhibitors. With a steady supply of different films, exhibitors finally had the possibility to open venues, where films were the central attraction. They did not have to worry about finding new audiences because the same audience would return again and again to watch different films. Exhibition practices greatly varied and programs lasted anywhere from ten minutes to an hour and a half or more in length. Often, programs ran continuously and patrons would join a program already in progress when they arrived and stay as long as they liked. While some nickelodeons only showed films, others offered shows that combined films with vaudeville acts or illustrated songs.

The desirability of longer films, which enabled nickelodeons to grow as they would, was the result of many factors. Economic competition between film production companies put pressure on them to create more elaborate, and often longer, films, to differentiate one film from another. Longer films were also more attractive, as the price paid by exhibitors depended on a film's length and the longer a film, the more profit there was to be made. Some exhibitors found longer films more desirable since it made programming easier, faster, and possibly cheaper, as they no longer had to organize their own programs by editing together a variety of short films. Directors had a great desire to make longer films, because it meant greater artistic innovation as they tried to find new ways to engage audiences. The popularity of longer films also meant an increase in production of fictional films as actualities decreased. One of the possible reasons for this shift is that fiction films were often easier to plan and cheaper to film than actualities, which were subject to various location-related difficulties. Fiction films quickly became standardized, and the popularity of longer films meant they outperformed actualities, which were usually short.

== Audience ==
Early writers on American cinema history assumed that audiences at nickelodeons were primarily working-class people who could not afford a higher ticket price.

At the heart of the image of nickelodeons in traditional histories is the belief that movies were a simple amusement for the working class, and that the middle-class stayed away until after World War I. This idea was reflected in Lewis Jacobs' 1939 survey, where he wrote: "concentrated largely in poorer shopping districts and slum neighborhoods, nickelodeons were disdained by the well-to-do. But, the workmen and their families who patronized the movies did not mind the crowded, unsanitary, and hazardous accommodations most of the nickelodeons offered."

More recent historians argue the rise of the middle class audiences throughout the nickelodeon era and into the later 1910s belief to expand the business. In 1985, Robert C. Allen debated whether movies attracted a middle-class audience as illustrated by the location of earlier movie theaters in traditional entertainment districts, where more nickelodeons were located in or near middle-class neighborhoods than on the Lower East Side.

The nickelodeon boom in Manhattan between 1905 and 1907 often functioned as historical shorthand for the rise of the movies in general. In 2004, Ben Singer wrote in his analysis of Manhattan nickelodeons; "for most people ... the image of cramped, dingy nickelodeons in Manhattan's Lower East Side ghetto stands as a symbol for the cinema's emergence in America." Nickelodeons consistently appeared in the densest areas of the city in terms of residential concentration and the amount of pedestrian traffic. Areas such as Union Square, Herald Square, 23rd Street, and 125th Street were typical locations and the larger movie theaters were set up there. Neighborhood nickelodeons, which were the majority of movie theaters in Manhattan, were almost always located in neighborhoods with high residential densities and spread over a substantial number of blocks.

== Types of nickelodeon programs ==
Nickelodeons usually showed films about ten to fifteen minutes in length, and in a variety of styles and subjects, such as short narratives, "scenics" (views of the world from moving trains), "actualities" (precursors of later documentary films), illustrated songs, local or touring song and dance acts, comedies, melodramas, problem plays, stop-action sequences, sporting events and other features which allowed them to compete with vaudeville houses.

The titles of a few of the films released in 1907 and distributed to nickelodeons by the Miles Brothers (Herbert, Harry and Earl C.) partially illustrate this diversity.

These are taken from a 1907 article published in The Saturday Evening Post:

- Catch the Kid (directed by Alf Collins; comedy)
- The Coroner's Mistake (comic ghost story)
- The Fatal Hand (directed by J. H. Martin; drama)
- Johnny's Run (directed by Frank Mottershaw; comedy)
- Knight-Errant (directed by J. H. Martin; old historical drama)
- A Mother's Sin (directed by J. H. Martin; drama)
- The Romany's Revenge (directed by Frank Mottershaw; drama)
- Roof to Cellar (comedy)
- Sailor's Return (drama)
- Village Fire Brigade (directed by James Williamson; comedy)
- Wizard's World (comedy)

Other 1907 films also distributed to nickelodeons by the Miles Brothers:

- Anarchist's Mother-in-Law
- Boss Away, Choppers Play
- Cambridge-Oxford Race
- Cheekiest Man on Earth
- Female Wrestlers
- Great Lion Hunt
- Indian Basket Weavers
- International Contest for the Heavyweight Championship: Squires vs. Burns
- Jim Jeffries on His California Ranch
- Life and Customs in India
- The Naval Nursery
- The Petticoat Regiment
- Shriners' Conclave at Los Angeles
- Squires, Australian Champion, in His Training Quarters
- That Awful Tooth
- The White Slave
- A Woman's Duel

== Decline ==
Though strong throughout the years from 1905 to 1913, nickelodeons became victims of their own success as attendance grew rapidly, necessitating larger auditoriums. Nickelodeons further declined with the advent of the feature film, and as cities grew and industry consolidation led to larger, more comfortable, better-appointed movie theaters. Longer films caused ticket prices to double from five cents to ten cents. Although their heyday was relatively brief, nickelodeons played an important part in creating a specialized spectator, "the moviegoer", who could now integrate going to the movies into their life in a way that was impossible before. Miriam Hansen has noted that the term "spectator" had become common by 1910. The nickelodeon explosion also increased the demand for new films, as thousands of theaters needed new product. The growth of longer films, which nickelodeons played a large part in stimulating, also led to the development of intertitles, which appeared in 1903 and helped make actions and scenes clearer as storylines became more complicated. A side-effect of this change was that it minimized the role of exhibitors, since they no longer had the editorial control of organizing single-shot films into programs, and now their narrative responsibility (some exhibitors would talk and help explain narratives as they unfolded) was also minimized by this "internal narration" in the film.

== See also ==
- Nickelodeon, a 1976 film about the early history of silent films

== General sources ==
- Allen, Robert C (1985). Film History: Theory and Practice. New York: McGraw Hill. p. 202.
- Aronson, Michael (2008). Nickelodeon City: Pittsburgh at the Movies, 1905–1929. University of Pittsburgh Press. p. 26. ISBN 978-0-8229-4322-8.
- Bowser, Eileen (1990). The Transformation of Cinema, 1907–1915. Berkeley: University of California Press. pp. 4–6.
- Musser, Charles (1990). The Emergence of Cinema: The American Screen to 1907. Berkeley: University of California Press.
- Grieveson, Lee (2004). The Silent Cinema Reader. New York: Routledge. ISBN 0-415-25283-0.
- Hansen, Miriam (1991). Babel and Babylon: Spectatorship and American Silent Film. Cambridge: Harvard University Press. ISBN 0-674-05831-3.
- Jacobs, Lewis (1939). The Rise of the American Film. New York: Harcourt Brace.
- Moskos, Charles C. (2018). Greek Americans: Struggle and Success. Routledge. ISBN 978-1-351-51672-3.
- Singer, Ben (2004). "Manhattan Nickelodeons: New Data on Audiences and Exhibitors" in The Silent Cinema Reader. New York: Routledge.

== External links and sources ==
- The Nickelodeons, written by Joseph Medill Patterson and published in the November 23, 1907 issue of The Saturday Evening Post
- "Story films" distributed by the Miles Brothers, from the American Film Institute Catalog of Feature Films
