= Pampered Menial =

- Original ABC Records cover. Artwork based on Low Life, a painting by Edwin Landseer.

Studio album by Pavlov's Dog
- Released: February 1975
- Recorded: 1973–1974
- Studios: CBS Studios, New York City
- Genre: Progressive rock
- Length: 33:32
- Labels: ABC, Columbia (reissue)
- Producers: Sandy Pearlman, Murray Krugman

Pavlov's Dog chronology
Pampered Menial (1975)	At the Sound of the Bell (1976)

Alternative cover
- Columbia Records reissue cover

Singles from Pampered Menial
- 1. "Julia / Episode" Released: 1975; 2. "Song Dance / Natchez Trace" Released: 1975

Audio sample
- "Julia": file; help

Professional ratings
Review scores
Source	Rating
AllMusic	3/5 stars
DMME	5/5 stars
The Great Rock Bible	9/10 stars
Metal Invader	favorable
Prog	4/5 stars
Rocking.gr (in Greek)	favorable

Pampered Menial is the debut album by American progressive rock/AOR band Pavlov's Dog, released in 1975.

The album features a line-up comprising David Surkamp, Steve Scorfina, Mike Safron, Rick Stockton, David Hamilton, Doug Rayburn and Siegfried Carver (born Richard Nadler). Carver left the band soon after the album was released. It was first released on ABC Records, debuting on the charts in early April. The LP was soon reissued by Columbia Records, whose version (with slightly different cover) entered the charts in mid-June, just after the ABC issue had dropped off the charts. Having both versions on sale in stores at nearly the same time may have confused buyers.

In the Q & Mojo Classic Special Edition Pink Floyd & the Story of Prog Rock, the album came number 26 in its list of "40 Cosmic Rock Albums".

== Track listing ==
All tracks credited to David Surkamp, except where noted. All information according to original vinyl liner notes.

No.	Title	Writer(s)	Length
1.	"Julia"		3:09
2.	"Late November"	Steve Scorfina, David Surkamp	3:10
3.	"Song Dance"	Mike Safron	4:58
4.	"Fast Gun"		3:08
5.	"Natchez Trace"	Steve Scorfina	3:40
6.	"Theme from Subway Sue"		4:25
7.	"Episode"		4:02
8.	"Preludin"	Siegfried Carver	1:37
9.	"Of Once and Future Kings"		5:23
Total length:			33:32

2007 Rockville Music reissue bonus tracks
No.	Title	Writer(s)	Length
10.	"Theme from Subway Sue" (Live Ford Auditorium Detroit '76)		4:25
11.	"Preludin" (Original 10 minutes version rec. live Ambassador Theatre St. Louis '75)	Siegfried Carver	9:58
12.	"I Wish it Would Rain" (Live Ambassador Theatre St. Louis '75)		5:48
13.	"Rainbow" (From the album Street Suite by Touch (orig. released 1969) feat. David Surkamp on vocals)		3:03

== Charts ==
Chart (1975)	Peak position
Australia (Kent Music Report)	23
US Top LPs & Tape (Billboard)	181

== Personnel ==
Pavlov's Dog

- David Surkamp: vocals, rhythm guitar
- Steve Scorfina: lead guitar
- David Hamilton: organ, piano, synthesizer
- Doug Rayburn: mellotron, flute
- Siegfried Carver: violin, viola, Vitar
- Rick Stockton: bass guitar
- Mike Safron: drums, percussion

Production

- Tim Geelan: recording engineer
- Lou Schlossberg: recorder
- Ed Sprigg: mixing engineer
- Howie Lindeman: mixing tape engineer
