= Alfeiousa =

Alfeiousa Αλφειούσα
- Community
- Location within Greece
- Coordinates: 37°38′N 21°32′E
- Country: Greece
- Administrative region: Western Greece
- Regional unit: Elis
- Municipality: Pyrgos
- Municipal unit: Volakas

Population (2021)
  - Community: 722
- Time zone: UTC+2 (EET)
  - Summer (DST): UTC+3 (EEST)
- Postal code: 27131

Alfeiousa (Greek: Αλφειούσα, before 1927: Βολάντζα - Volantza) is a village in Elis, Greece.

It belongs to the municipal unit of Volakas, in the Municipality of Pyrgos. The village is approximately 9 km southeast of Pyrgos, 8 km west of Olympia, 4 km northeast of Epitalio and 2 km south of Salmoni, at an altitude of 31 meters.

Its residents are mainly engaged in agriculture, cultivating vines, olives and raisins.

== Etymology ==
In the past, the village was called Volantza, which probably derives from the Greek word βῶλαξ, meaning a lump of soil that is formed while plowing. Situated on the south bank of the river Alfeios, it was officially renamed to Alfeiousa in 1927, taking its name from the river.

== Population ==
Year	Population
1689	12
1879	706
1940	1,303
1951	1,207
1961	1,300
1981	1,017
1991	1,052
2001	988
2011	1,037
2021	722

== See also ==
- List of settlements in Elis
