= Panagia Skafidia Monastery =

Monastery in Elis, Greece

- Μονή Παναγίας Σκαφιδιάς
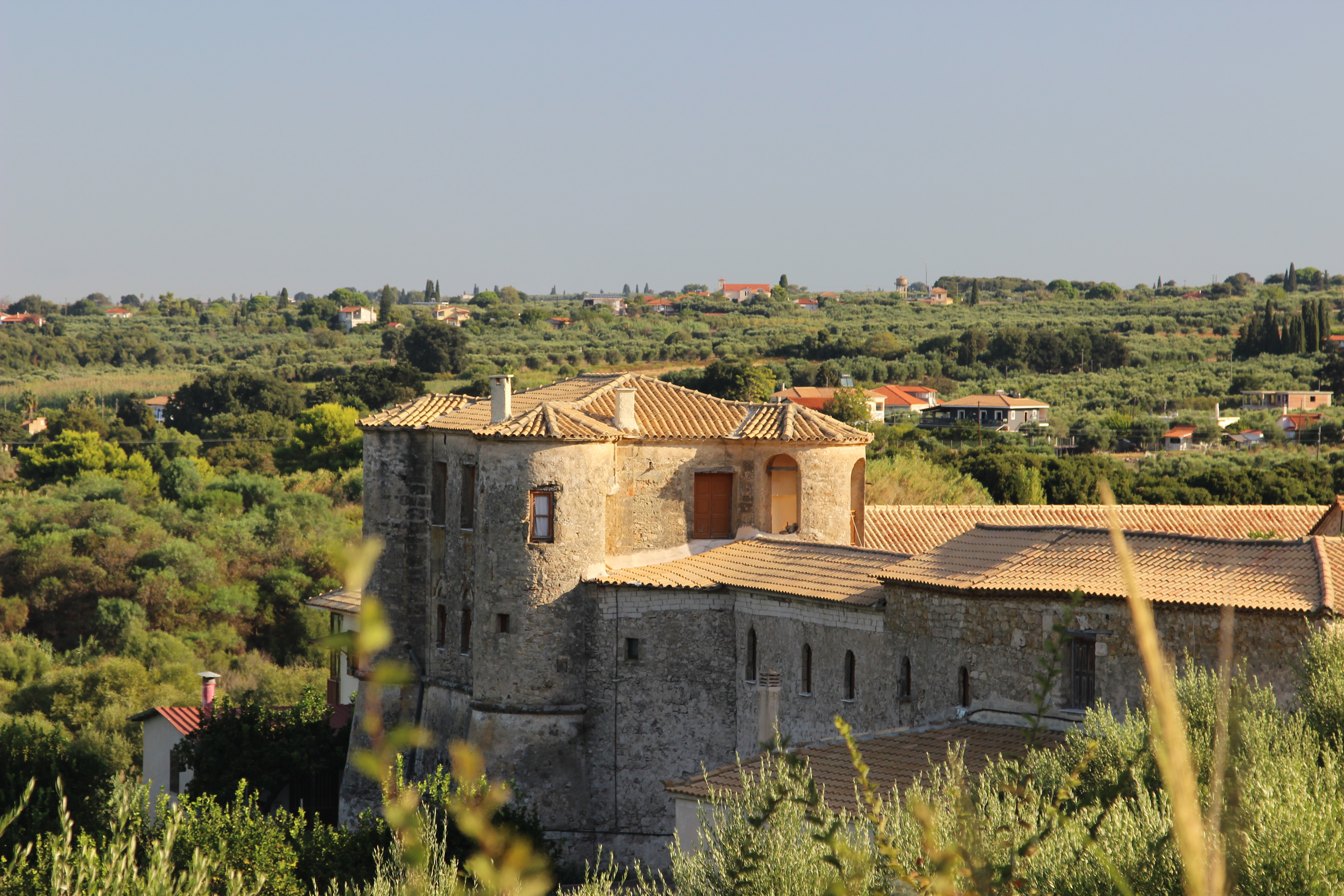
- Interactive map of Panagia Skafidia Monastery

Monastery information
- Established: 10th century
- Dedication: Dormition of Theotokos
- Celebration: August 15
- Diocese: Metropolis of Elis and Olena

Site
- Location: Skafidia, Elis
- Country: Greece
- Coordinates: 37°42′2″N 21°19′33″E

The Panagia Skafidia Monastery (Greek: Μονή Παναγίας Σκαφιδιάς) is an Orthodox Greek women's monastery dedicated to the Dormition of Theotokos and is located in the County of Elis, in the Local Community of Skafidia, 12 km outside the town of Pyrgos. It belongs to the Holy Metropolis of Elis and Olena.

== Historical evidence & tradition ==
The monastery of Panagia Skafidiotissa or Skafidia, from which it took its name, was built around the 10th century. Next to the clear blue waters of the Ionian, at the mouth of the river Iardanos. The visitor will be dazzled by seeing the medieval fortress that surrounds it from afar.

In addition to its remarkable architecture, it also has many religious and historical treasures such as: Holy vessels, vestments, reliquaries, uniforms, weapons, icons, coins, votives and the banner of the Monastery made of a hand-embroidered icon dedicated to Theotokos.

Important is the archive of the Monastery and the library with many handwritten books, which refer to liturgical, musical, hagiographic and other subjects, but also to the history of the Monastery and its participation in the Greek Revolution of 1821.

Today the Monastery consists of four Nuns, with the Abbess the Nun Makaria Efstratiou (Makaria II)

== Sources ==
- Photographies
- Dimitriou Kokkoris, "Orthodox Greek Monasteries".
