= Kardamas =

Kardamas Καρδαμάς
- Community
- Location within Greece
- Coordinates: 37°46′N 21°20′E
- Country: Greece
- Administrative region: West Greece
- Regional unit: Elis
- Municipality: Ilida
- Municipal unit: Amaliada

Population (2021)
  - Community: 826
- Time zone: UTC+2 (EET)
  - Summer (DST): UTC+3 (EEST)
- Vehicle registration: ΗΑ

Kardamas (Greek: Καρδαμάς) is a village and a community in the municipal unit of Amaliada, in Elis, Greece. It is located in the plains near the Ionian Sea, 3 km north of Douneika, 3 km southwest of Amaliada, and 14 km northwest of Pyrgos. The community includes the small village of Petroules. Kardamas had a train station on the line from Patras to Pyrgos.

== Population ==
Year	Community population	Village population
1981		873
1991		1,001
2001	1,196	1,097
2011	948	977
2021	807	826

== People ==
- Panagiotis Adraktas (b. September 28, 1948), politician
- Vangelis Baktis (b. November 14, 1985), physicist
- Michael Bramos (b. May 27, 1987), basketball player

== See also ==
- List of settlements in Elis
