= Douneika =

Douneika Δουναίικα
- Community
- Location within Greece
- Coordinates: 37°45′N 21°20′E
- Country: Greece
- Administrative region: West Greece
- Regional unit: Elis
- Municipality: Ilida
- Municipal unit: Amaliada

Population (2021)
  - Community: 653
- Time zone: UTC+2 (EET)
  - Summer (DST): UTC+3 (EEST)
- Postal code: 271 00
- Area code: 26220
- Vehicle registration: ΗΑ

Douneika (Greek: Δουναίικα, also: Δουνέικα - Dounika) is a village and a community in the southern part of the municipal unit of Amaliada in Elis, Greece. It is situated near the Ionian Sea coast, 3 km south of Kardamas, 4 km northwest of Myrtia, 4 km west of Alpochori and 6 km south of Amaliada. The Greek National Road 9/E55 (Patras - Pyrgos) passes northeast of the village. The community consists of the villages Douneika, Agia Marina, Danika and Kato Kertezeika.

== Geography ==
Year	Village population	Community population
1981	-	866
1991	708	-
2001	771	891
2011	616	677
2021	575	653

== See also ==
- List of settlements in Elis
