= Korakochori =

Korakochori Κορακοχώρι
- Settlement
- Location within Greece
- Coordinates: 37°40′N 21°19′E
- Country: Greece
- Administrative region: West Greece
- Regional unit: Elis
- Municipality: Pyrgos
- Municipal unit: Pyrgos

Population (2021)
  - Community: 216
- Time zone: UTC+2 (EET)
  - Summer (DST): UTC+3 (EEST)

Korakochori (Greek: Κορακοχώρι meaning "crow village") is a village and a community in the municipality of Pyrgos, Elis, Greece. The community includes the small villages Agios Andreas, Kallithea and Bouka. It is located by the Ionian Sea, 2 km southwest of Leventochori, 3 km north of Katakolo and 11 km west of Pyrgos town centre.

== Population ==
Year	Population	Community population
1981	162	-
1991	187	-
2001	211	284
2011	213	281
2021	142	216

== See also ==
- List of settlements in Elis
