= Volakas =

Volakas (Greek: Βώλακας) may refer to:

- Volakas, Drama, a village in the municipality Kato Nevrokopi, Drama regional unit, Greece
- Volakas, Elis, a municipality in Elis, Greece
- Volakas, Tinos, a village on the island of Tinos in the Cyclades, Greece
