= Varvasaina =

Varvasaina Βαρβάσαινα
- Community
- Location within Greece
- Coordinates: 37°40′06″N 21°29′42″E
- Country: Greece
- Administrative region: West Greece
- Regional unit: Elis
- Municipality: Pyrgos
- Municipal unit: Pyrgos

Population (2021)
  - Community: 1,032
- Time zone: UTC+2 (EET)
  - Summer (DST): UTC+3 (EEST)
- Postal code: 271 00
- Area code: 26210

Varvasaina (Greek: Βαρβάσαινα) is a village and a community in the eastern part of the municipality of Pyrgos, Elis, Greece. The community consists of the villages Varvasaina and Kato Varvasaina. It is situated in a valley between low hills, 3 km southeast of Koliri, 3 km northwest of Salmoni, 5 km north of Epitalio and 5 km east of Pyrgos town centre. The Greek National Road 74 (Pyrgos - Olympia - Tripoli) passes south of the village. The railway from Pyrgos to Kalamata and Olympia passes through Kato Varvasaina.

== Historical population ==
Historical population
Year	Pop.	±%
2001	1,293	—
2011	1,202	−7.0%
2021	1,032	−14.1%

== See also ==
- List of settlements in Elis
