= Koliri =

Koliri Κολίρι
- Community
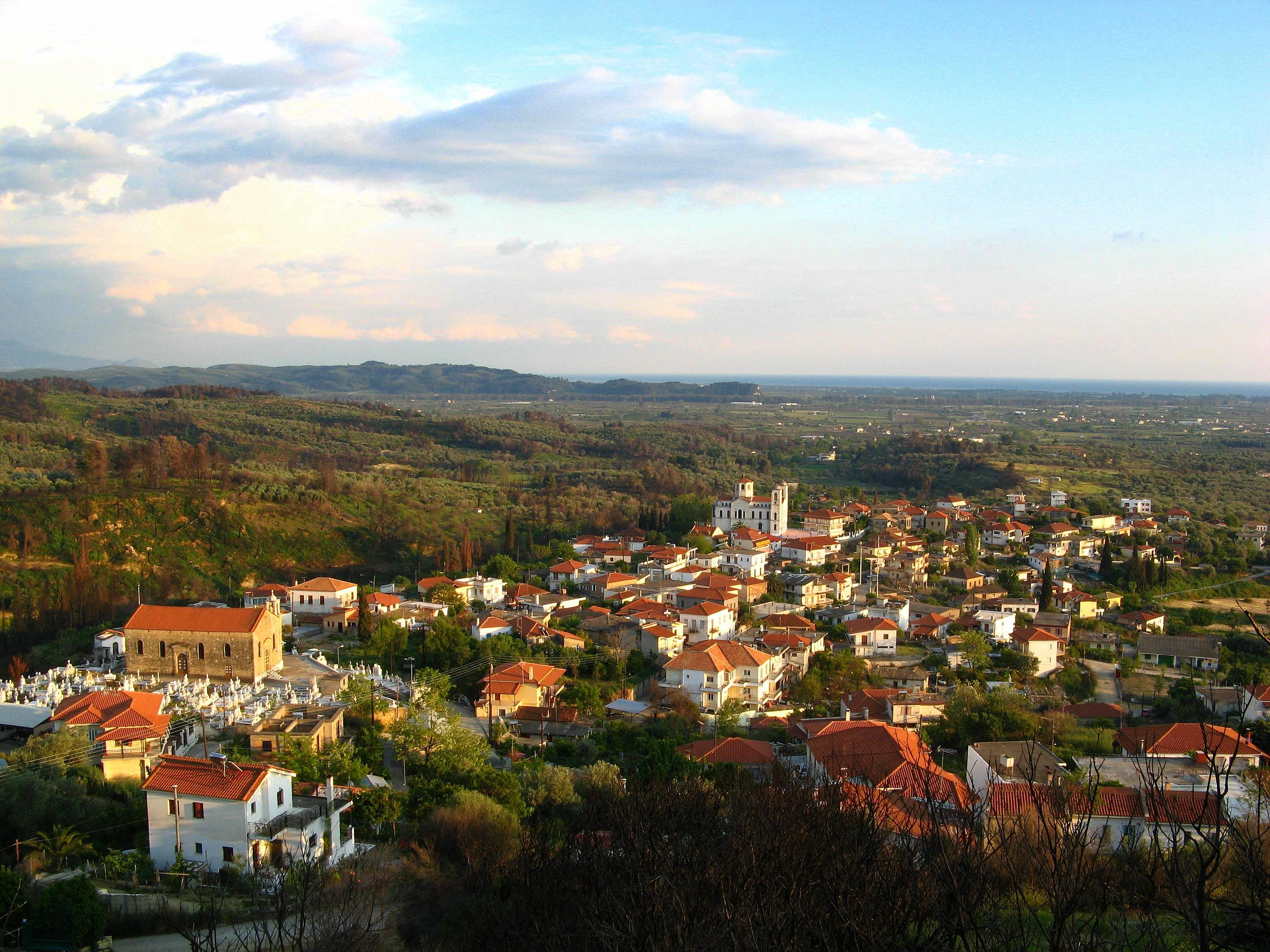

- Location within Greece
- Coordinates: 37°41′15″N 21°28′25″E
- Country: Greece
- Administrative region: West Greece
- Regional unit: Elis
- Municipality: Pyrgos
- Municipal unit: Pyrgos

Population (2021)
  - Community: 787
- Time zone: UTC+2 (EET)
  - Summer (DST): UTC+3 (EEST)

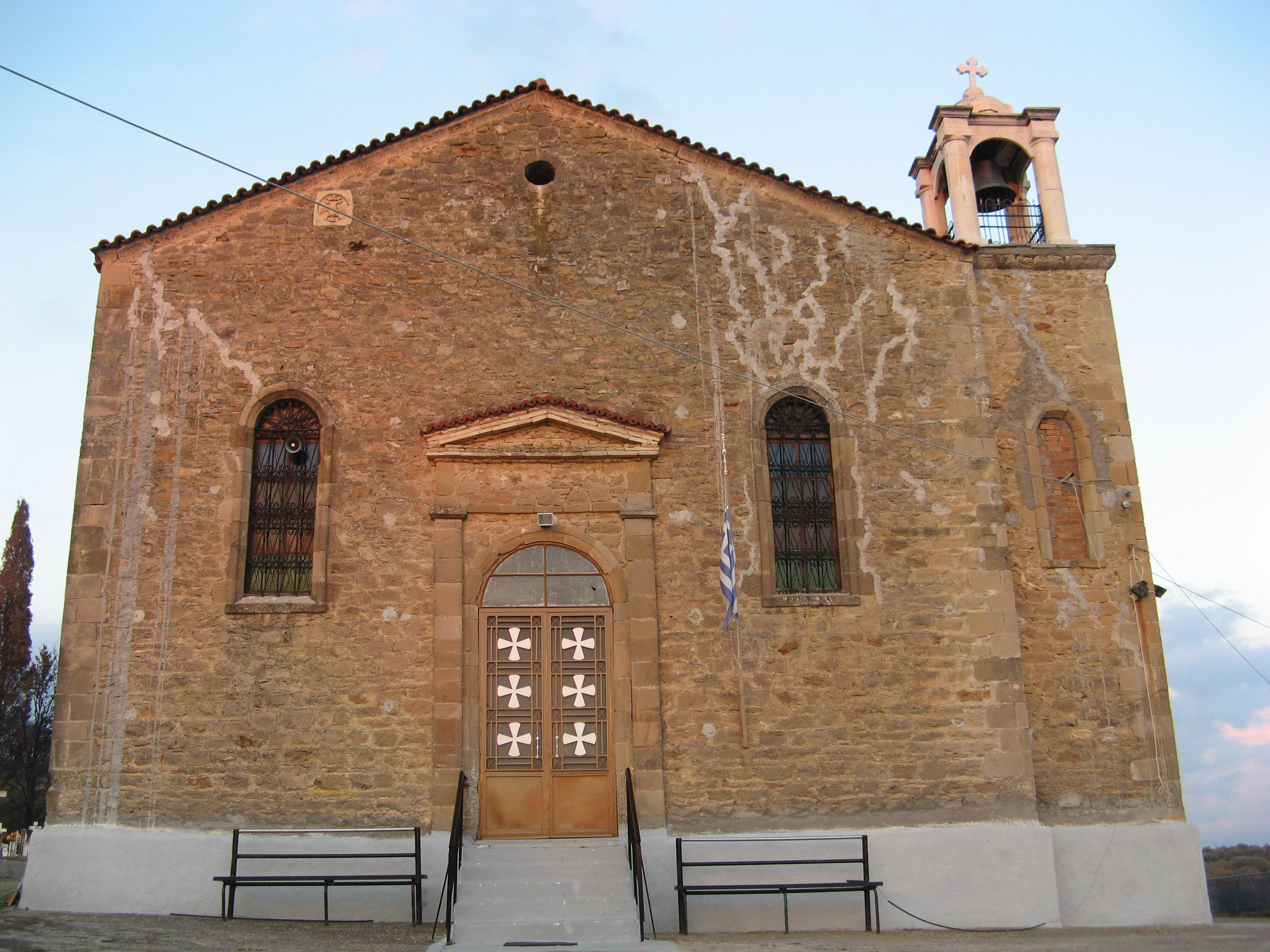
Saint Nicolas Church

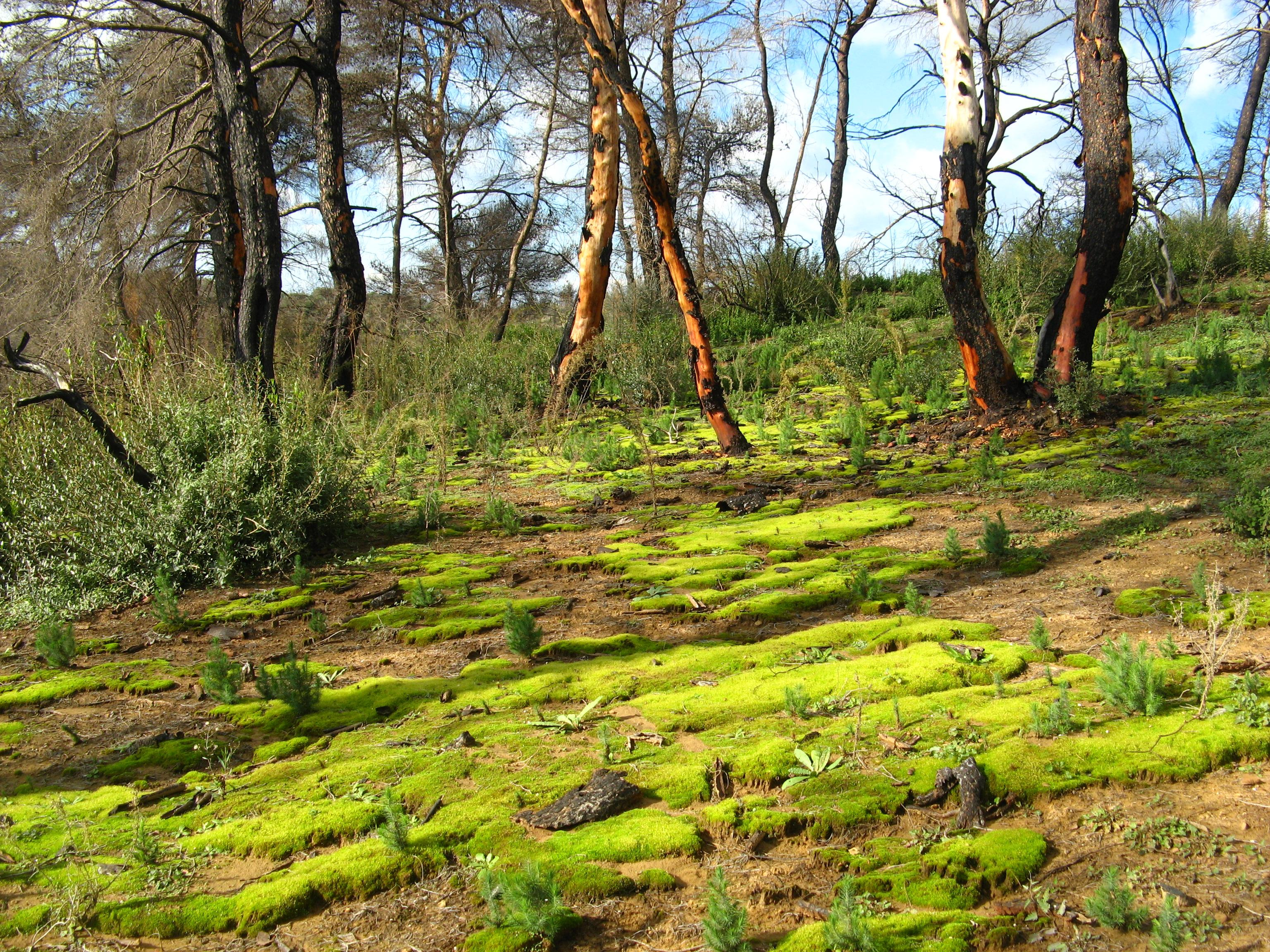
Small pine trees appeared after the fires of August 2007

Koliri, (Greek: Κολίρι) is a village and a community in the municipality of Pyrgos, Elis, Greece. It is situated on a hillside, 3 km northeast of Pyrgos town centre and 3 km northwest of Varvasaina. The Greek National Road 74 (Tripoli – Olympia – Pyrgos) passes south of the village. The community includes the village Kolireikes Paragkes. It has two churches: the Church of Saint Nicholas and the Church of the Saints Theodore. Its elevation is 90 m. Koliri suffered damage from the fires of August 2007. Koliri has a football team called Anatoli (meaning Sunrise in Greek), which plays in the local championships.

== Population ==
Year	Village	Community
1981	–	1,012
1991	815	–
2001	708	1,061
2011	621	979
2021	597	787

== Gallery ==
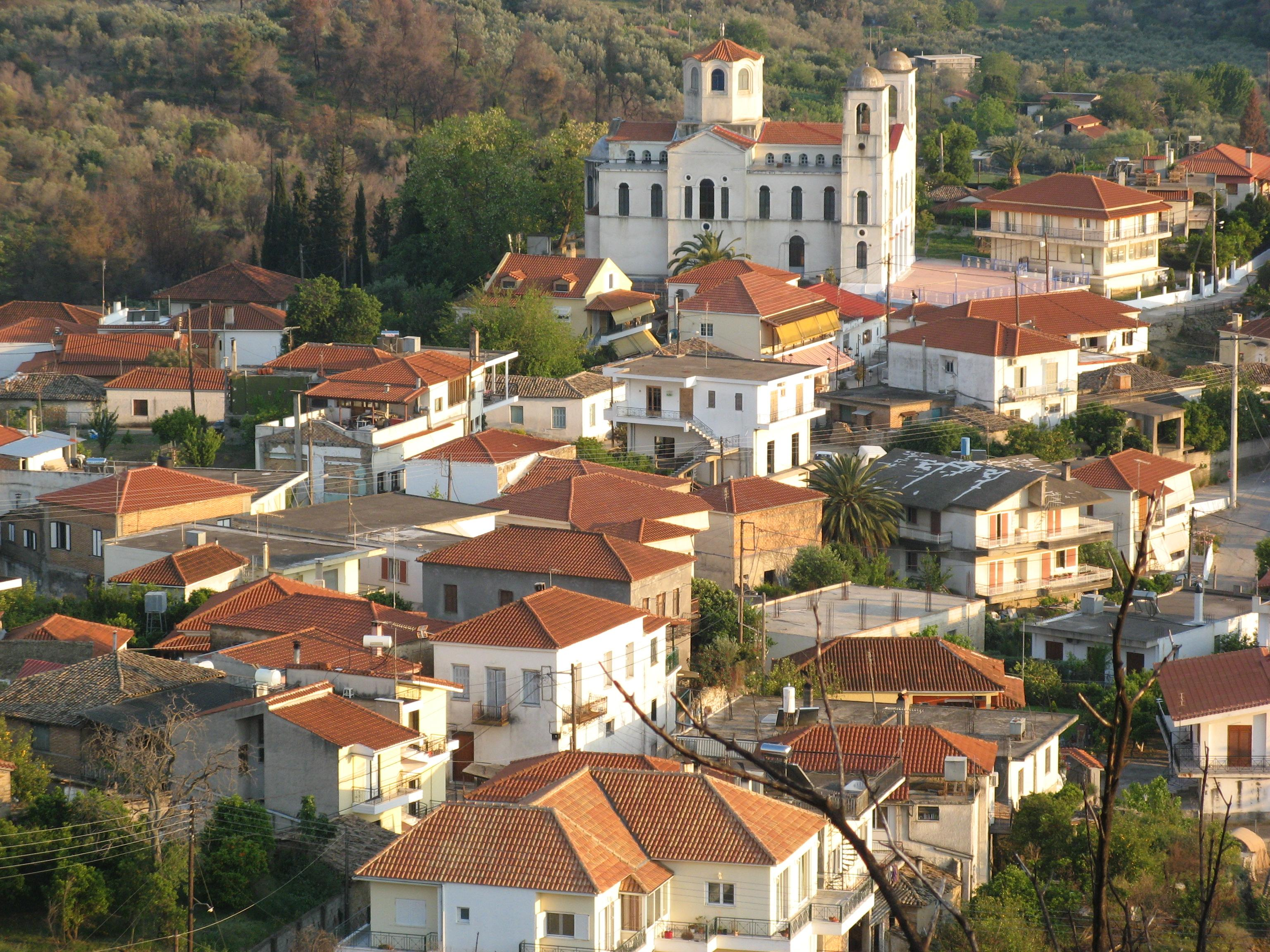
the center of the village along with Saint Theodoroi main church

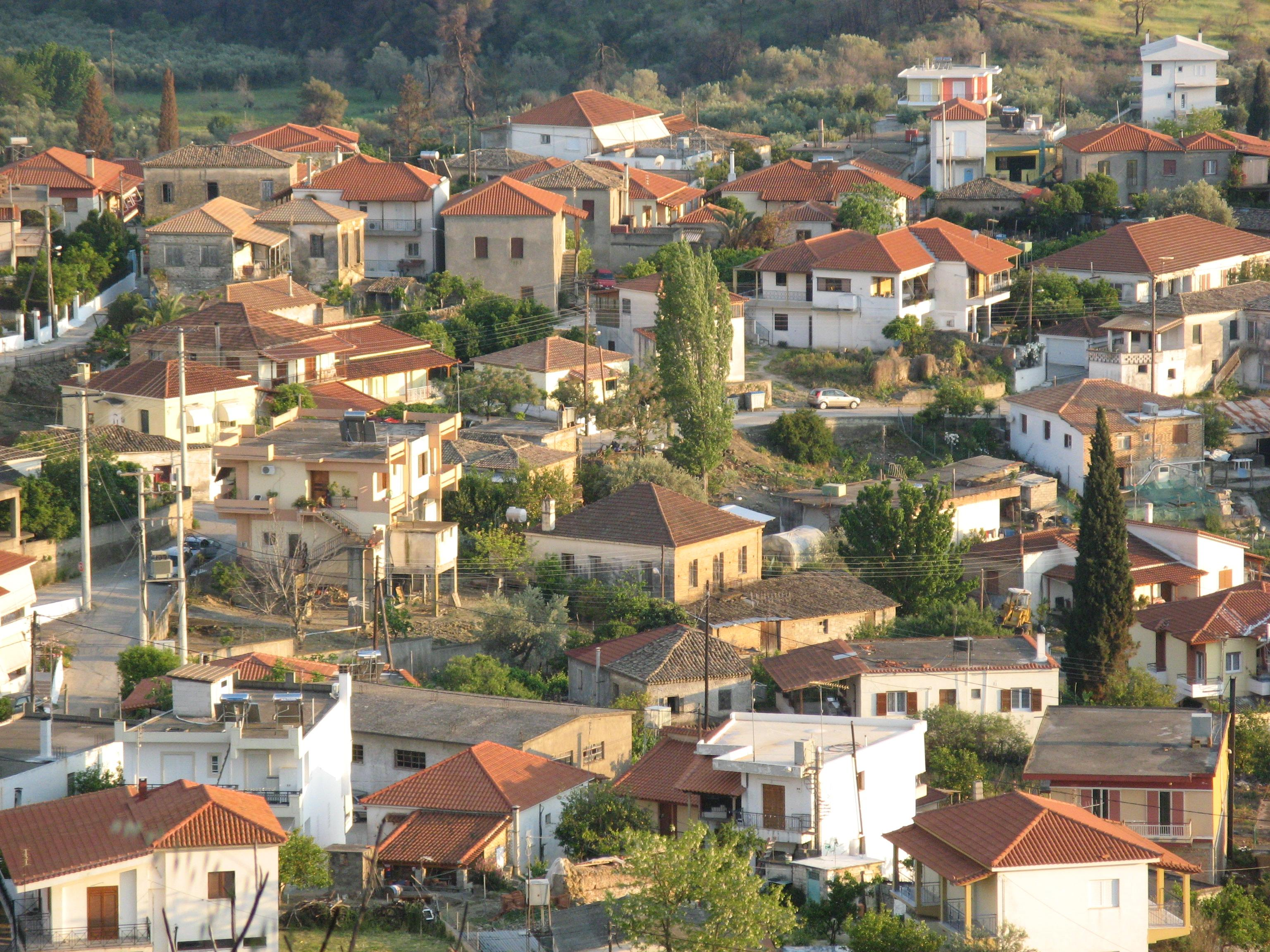
The centre

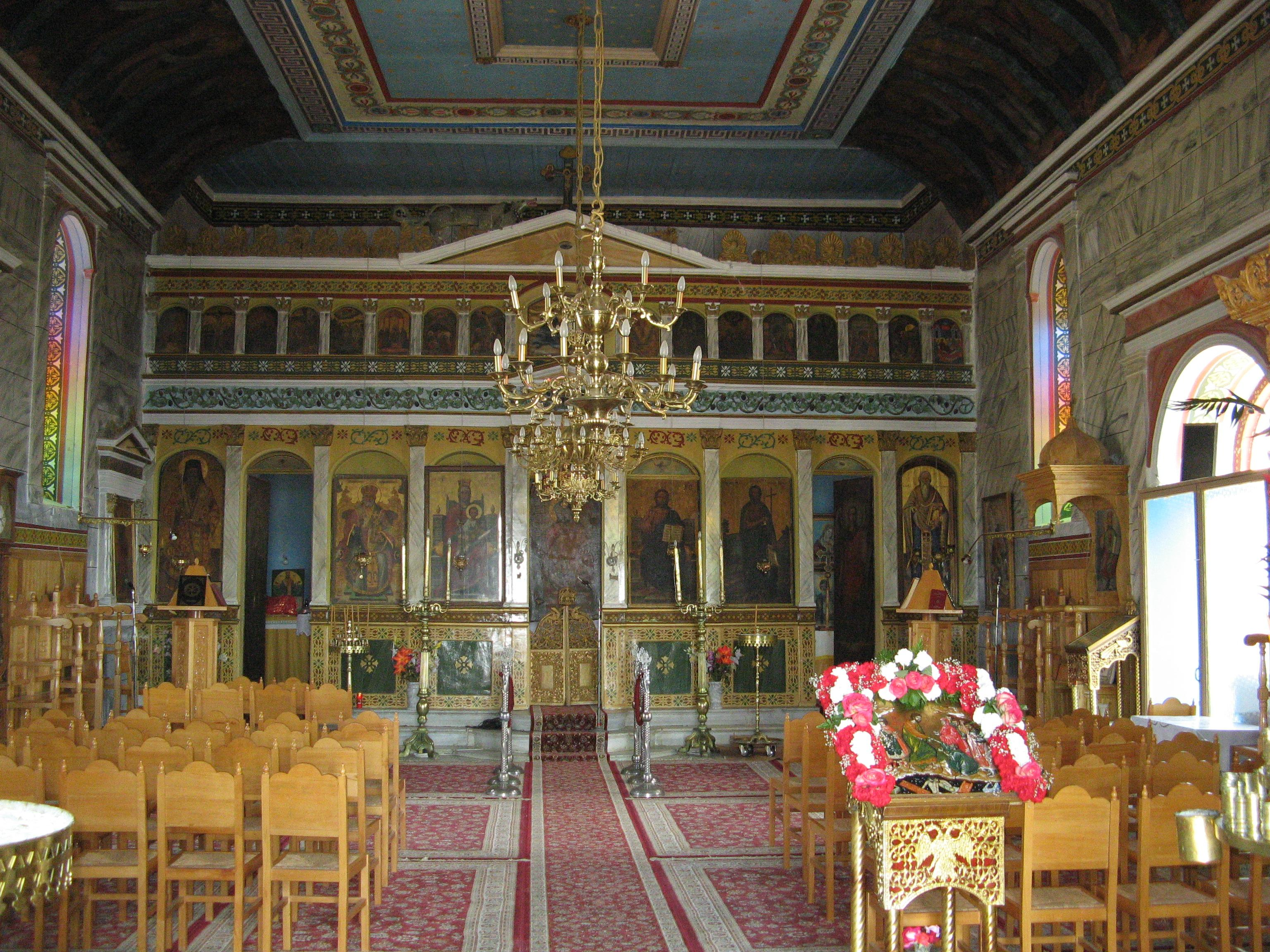
Interior of Saint Nicholas Church.

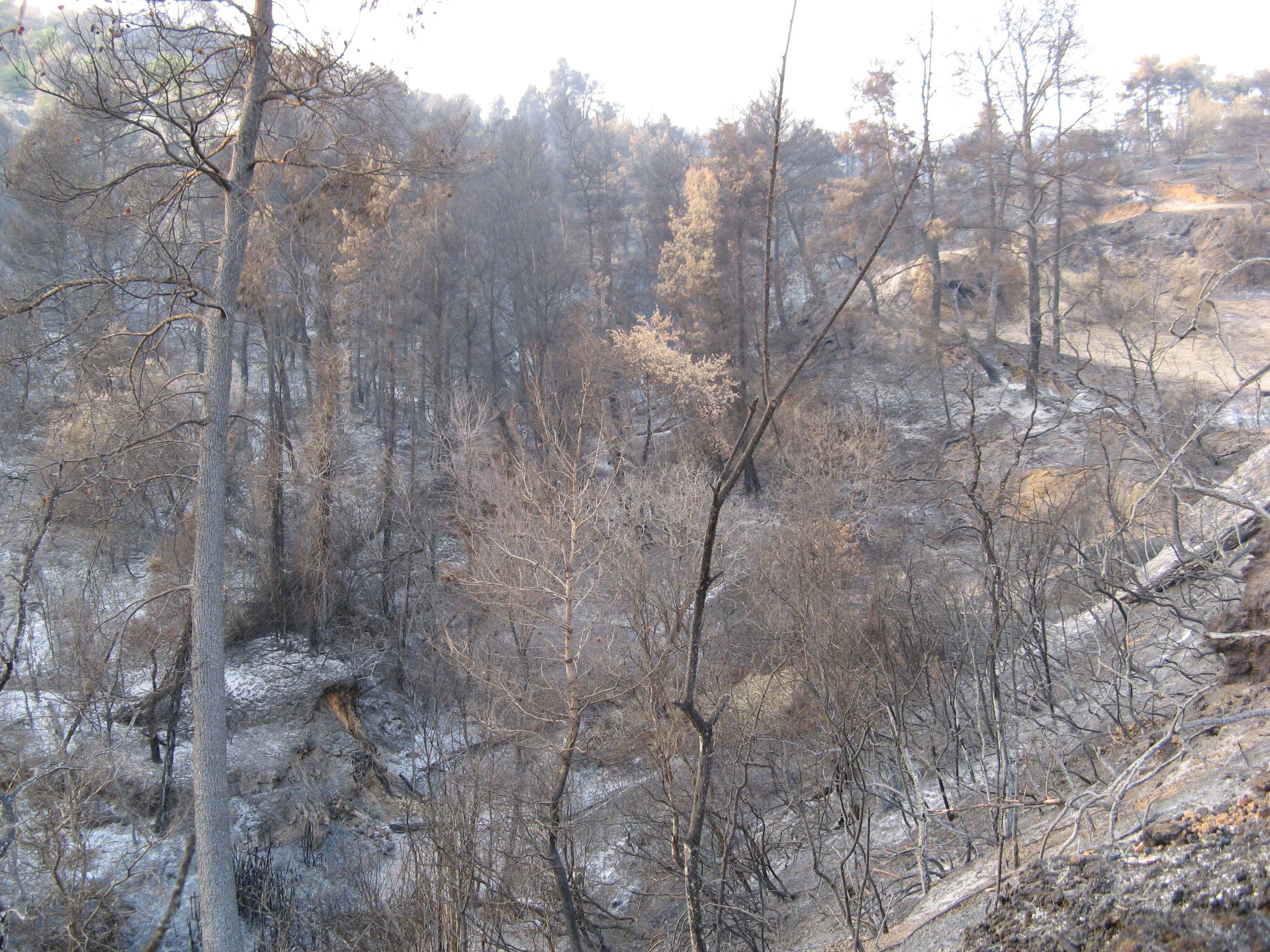
The forest after the fire

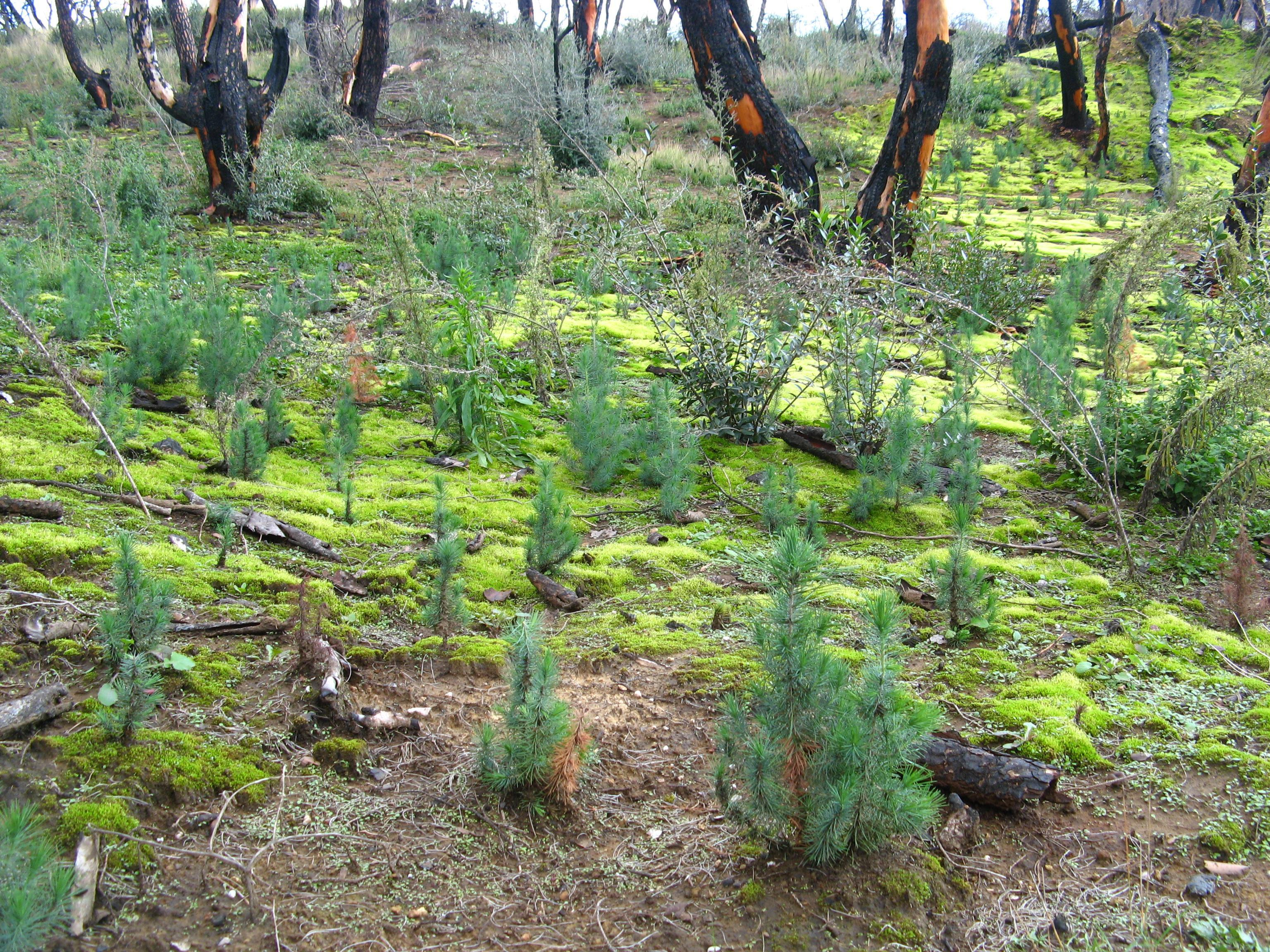
Small pine trees appeared after the fires of August 2007

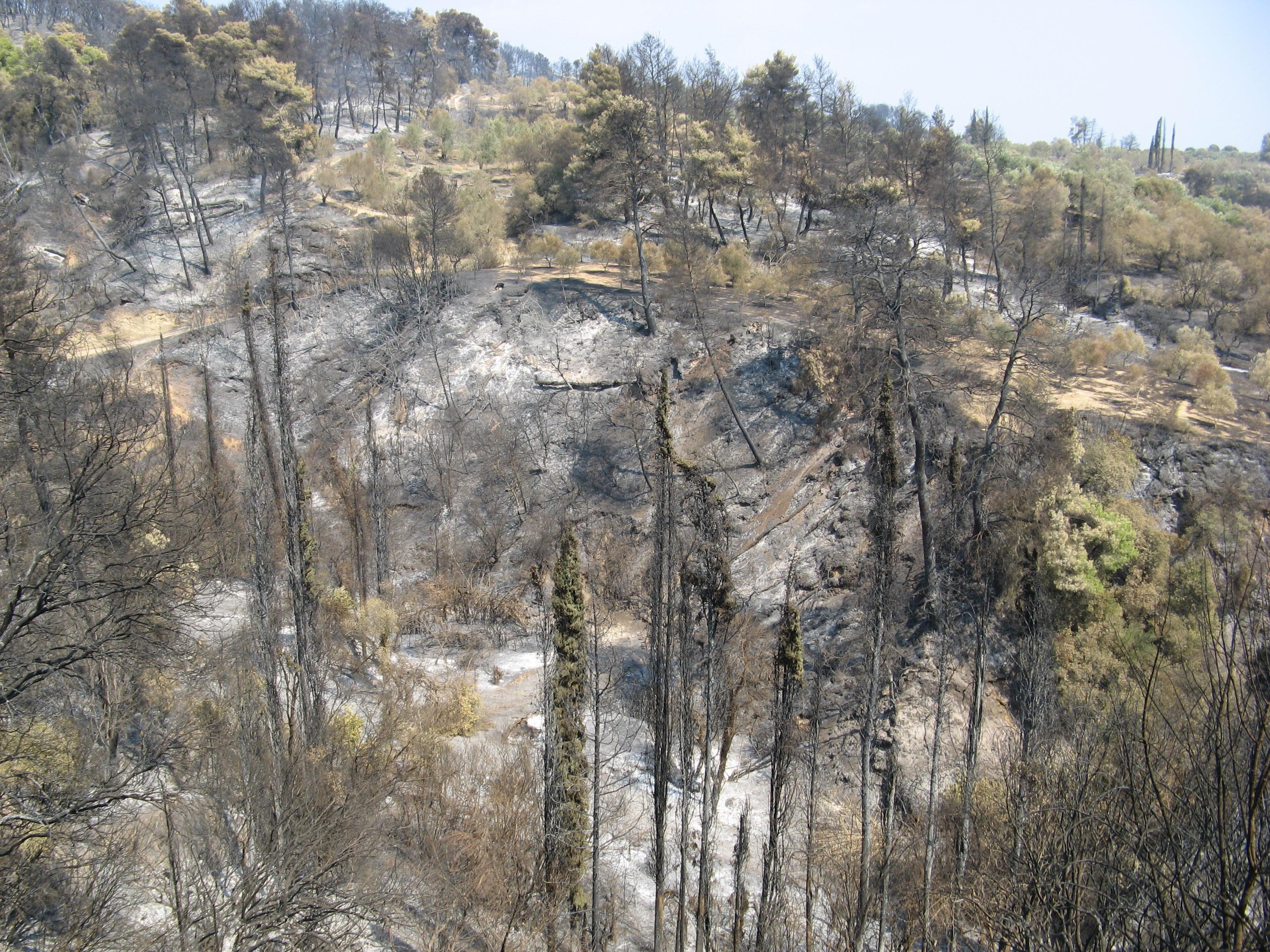
The forest after the fires

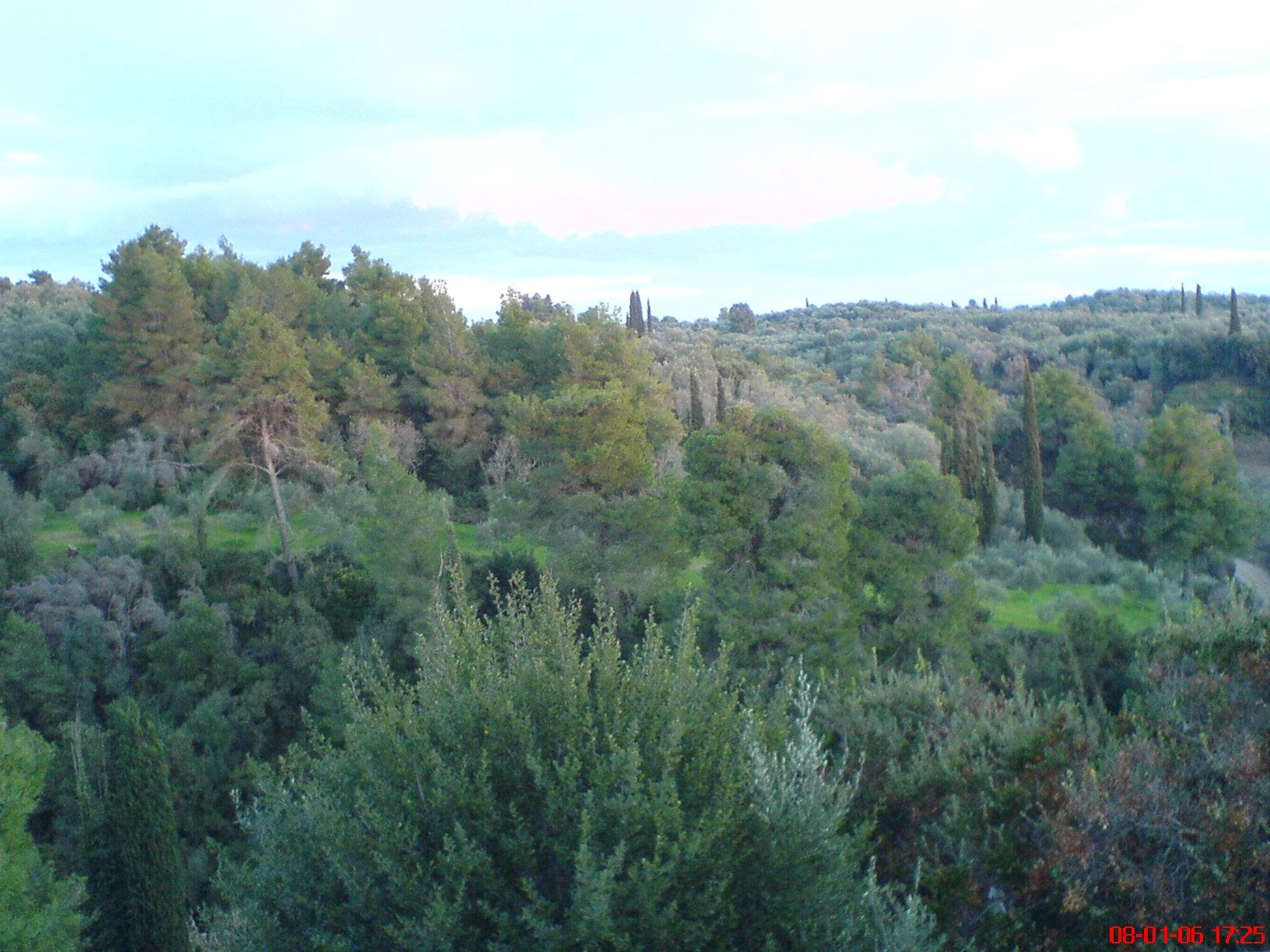
The forest before the fires

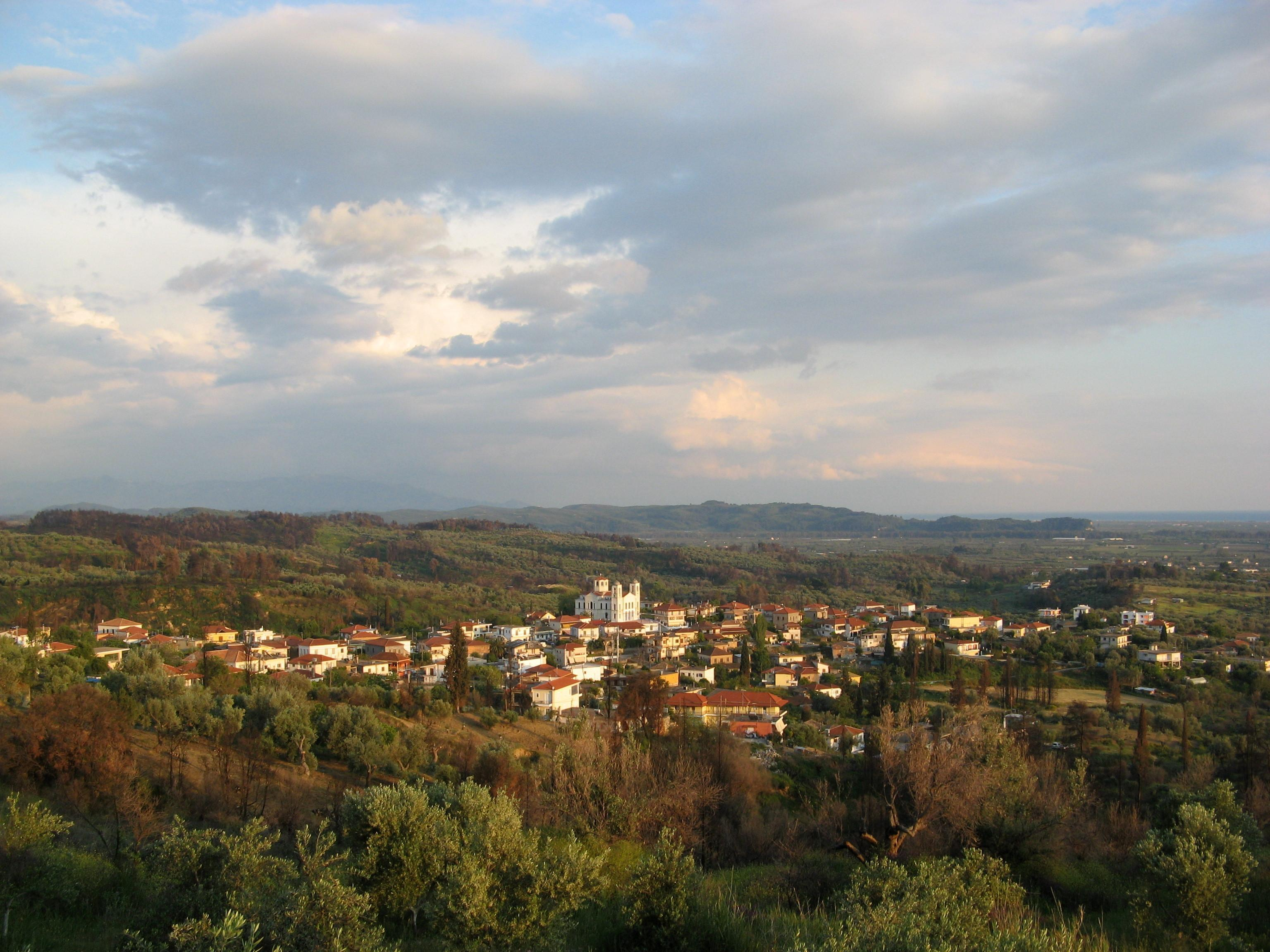
Overview of the village

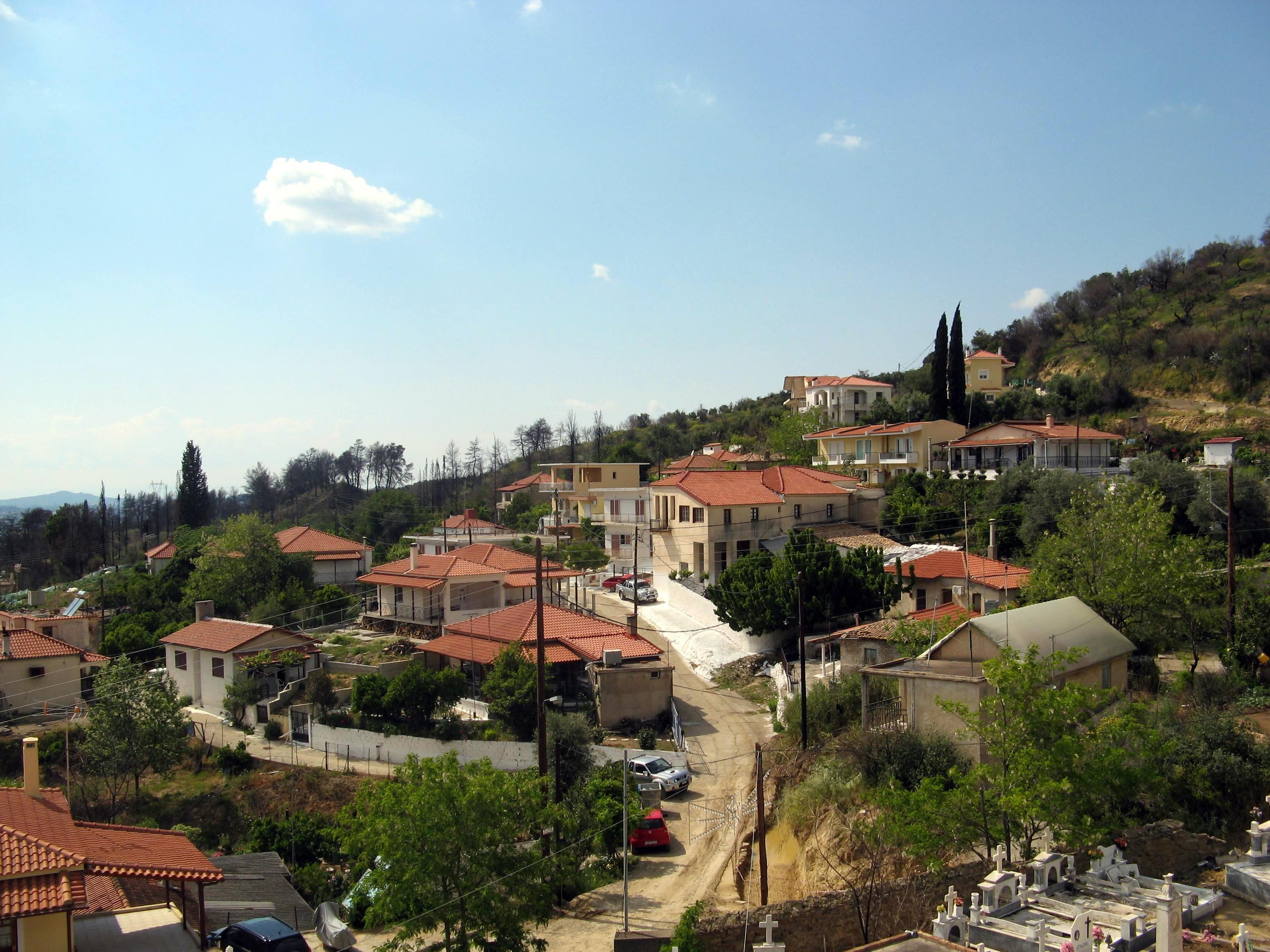
The area of the village next to Saint Nicholas Church

== See also ==
- List of settlements in Elis
