= Theodoros Xydis =

Greek poet and essayist (1909–1985)

Theodore Xydis (Greek: Θεόδωρος Ξύδης; 1909–1985) was a Greek poet and essayist.

== Biography ==
Born in Pyrgos Ileia, Xydis studied literature at the University of Athens and then worked briefly as a teacher. In literature he first appeared in 1931 (with the study Palamas apo mia poiitiki syllogi tou/Palamas a poetic collection) and then published (1932) a study titled The poetic will of Angelos Sikelianos. He collaborated with many magazines (Nea Estia, Elliniki Dimiourgia, Idea, Nea Grammata, Peiraika Grammata, Filologiki Protochronia) publishing poems, book reviews and literary studies.

Theodore Xidis was a scholar, biographer and friend of Angelos Sikelianos. Sikelianos was a key reference point in his research work (various publications in magazines and newspapers). Anna Sikelianos called him a 'faithful biographer’ (" together with us are only my mother, our best man with his beloved sisters and our faithful biographer Theodore Xidis" she specifically writes about her marriage to Angelos). He described the Delphic Idea as a "vision of Greekness" and underlined the Greek dimension of "Space" and the "Idea" of the "Navel of Delphi" while highlighting the key role that this idea played in the work of the poet. He was a wholehearted supporter of the idea. He wrote about the key issues of the life and poetry of Sikelianos (the loneliness and responsibility of the artist, the social role of his poetry, the Delphic Vision etc.), and the literary relationship with Sikelianos (articles about letters Sikelianos sent to him).

Some indicative articles on Sikelianos are the following: (Nea Estia Magazine): Sikelianos and the ancient myth, The ancestors of Sikelianos, Kazantzakis and Sikelianos, Lefkas on Sikelianos, Sikelianos` first poem, The Delphi Intellectual Centre and Sikelianos, etc.

Xydis died in 1985 in Athens.
