= Panagiotis Adraktas =

Greek politician

Panagiotis Adraktas (Greek: Παναγιώτης Αδράκτας, born September 28, 1948) is a Greek politician. He was born in Kardamas in northwestern Elis. He is a doctor and doctorate at the Medical Faculty of the University of Athens. He was elected in the 2nd Athens constituency in June 1989, November 1989 and 1990. He returned to Ilia and ran as a politician in 2000, 2004 and 2007 as a member of the New Democracy party. He was a municipal counselor in Chaidari between 1980 and 1986 and Peristeri in 1990.

== Εξωτερικές συνδέσεις ==
- Main page of Panagiotis Adraktas (in Greek)
