= Nakis Avgerinos =

Greek politician

Nakis Avgerinos Νάκης Αυγερινός
- Born: 1911; Pyrgos, Elis, Greece
- Died: 2002; Athens, Greece
- Occupation: politician

Nakis Avgerinos (Greek: Νάκης Αυγερινός, 1911 – November 4, 2002) was a Greek politician.

He was born in Pyrgos, Elis, the son of Charalampos Avgerinos, mayor of Pyrgos, a relative of the old Pyrgiotiki family dominated local politics for over a century. Avgerinos studied in Athens and became a judge in Patras and later in Pyrgos. In the 1946 election, he was elected MP for the Liberal Party and in 1956 for the Liberal Democratic Union. He was voted several times as a member of parliament for Elis.

He died on November 4, 2002, in Athens. He had a daughter named Chrysafoula. He was the last line of the historic Avgerino family.
