= Skafidia =

Skafidia Σκαφιδιά
- Community
- Location within Greece
- Coordinates: 37°42′N 21°20′E
- Country: Greece
- Administrative region: West Greece
- Regional unit: Elis
- Municipality: Pyrgos
- Municipal unit: Pyrgos

Population (2021)
  - Community: 248
- Time zone: UTC+2 (EET)
  - Summer (DST): UTC+3 (EEST)

Skafidia (Greek: Σκαφιδιά) is a village and a community in the municipality of Pyrgos, Elis, Greece. It is situated on the Ionian Sea coast, at the foot of a low hill. It is 1 km north of Leventochori, 3 km southwest of Myrtia and 11 km northwest of Pyrgos. The community includes the small villages Kalakaiika and Patronikolaiika. The site of the ancient town of Dyspontium is within its area.

== Population ==
Year	Settlement population	Community population
1981	-	215
1991	88	-
2001	128	231
2011	122	211
2021	151	248

== See also ==
- List of settlements in Elis
