= Dyspontium =

Town in ancient Elis

Dyspontium (Ancient Greek: Δυσπόντιον) was one of the eight towns of Pisatis in ancient Elis. It was situated in the plain between Elis and Olympia, north of the river Alpheus and not far from the sea. It has been identified with the modern village Skafidia. Pausanias writes that in the time of king Pyrrhus of Pisatis, the cities of Pisa, Makistos, Scillus, and Dyspontium rebelled against the Eleans because of the organization of the Olympic Games. Pisa and its allies were defeated, and their cities were destroyed (c. 575 BCE). After the city was destroyed, many of its inhabitants moved to Epidamnus and Apollonia. According to local legend, the town was founded by Dysponteus, son of Oenomaus, though Stephanus of Byzantium refers to him as a son of Pelops.
