= Agios Ilias, Pyrgos =

Agios Ilias Άγιος Ηλίας
- Community
- Location within Greece
- Coordinates: 37°43′01″N 21°19′52″E
- Country: Greece
- Geographic region: Peloponnese
- Administrative region: Western Greece
- Regional unit: Elis
- Municipality: Pyrgos
- Municipal unit: Pyrgos

Population (2021)
  - Community: 287
- Time zone: UTC+2 (EET)
  - Summer (DST): UTC+3 (EEST)

Agios Ilias (Greek: Άγιος Ηλίας, also Άγιος Ηλίας Λετρίνων - Agios Ilias Letrinon) is a village and community in the municipality of Pyrgos in western Elis, Greece. It was an independent community from 1919 until 1997.

== See also ==
- List of settlements in Elis
