= Agios Ioannis, Elis =

Agios Ioannis
- Community
- Location within Greece
- Coordinates: 37°40′44″N 21°23′10″E
- Country: Greece
- Administrative region: West Greece
- Regional unit: Elis
- Municipality: Pyrgos
- Municipal unit: Pyrgos

Population (2021)
  - Community: 545
- Time zone: UTC+2 (EET)
  - Summer (DST): UTC+3 (EEST)

Agios Ioannis (Greek: Άγιος Ιωάννης, also Άγιος Ιωάννης Λετρίνων - Agios Ioannis Letrinon) is a settlement and community in the municipality of Pyrgos, Elis, Peloponnese, Greece. It was an independent community between 1912 and 1997. The name translates as "Saint John".

== See also ==
- List of settlements in Elis
