= Skourochori =

Skourochori Σκουροχώρι
- Community
- Location within Greece
- Coordinates: 37°41′N 21°21′E
- Country: Greece
- Administrative region: West Greece
- Regional unit: Elis
- Municipality: Pyrgos
- Municipal unit: Pyrgos

Population (2021)
  - Community: 639
- Time zone: UTC+2 (EET)
  - Summer (DST): UTC+3 (EEST)

Skourochori (Greek: Σκουροχώρι) is a village and a community in the municipality of Pyrgos, Elis, Greece. The community includes the village Kato Kavouri. It is situated near the Ionian Sea, at the foot of a low hill. It is 3 km south of Myrtia, 3 km east of Leventochori, 5 km northeast of Katakolo and 8 km west of Pyrgos town centre.

== Population ==
Year	Population	Community population
1981	648	-
1991	619	-
2001	584	702
2011	610	782
2021	536	639

== People ==
- Spyros Skouras
- Charles Skouras
- George Skouras

== See also ==
- List of settlements in Elis
