= Leventochori, Elis =

Leventochori Λεβεντοχώρι
- Community
- Location within Greece
- Coordinates: 37°41′N 21°20′E
- Country: Greece
- Administrative region: West Greece
- Regional unit: Elis
- Municipality: Pyrgos
- Municipal unit: Pyrgos

Population (2021)
  - Community: 161
- Time zone: UTC+2 (EET)
  - Summer (DST): UTC+3 (EEST)

Leventochori (Greek: Λεβεντοχώρι) is a village in the municipality of Pyrgos, Elis, Greece. It is located near the Ionian Sea, at the foot of a low hill. It is 1 km south of Skafidia, 3 km west of Skourochori, 4 km northeast of Katakolo and 10 km west of Pyrgos town centre.

== Population ==
Year	Population
1981	207
1991	238
2001	271
2011	204
2021	161

== See also ==
- List of settlements in Elis
