= Volakas, Elis =

Volakas Βώλακας
- Municipal unit
- Location within the regional unit

- Location within Greece
- Coordinates: 37°37′N 21°30′E
- Country: Greece
- Administrative region: West Greece
- Regional unit: Elis
- Municipality: Pyrgos

Area
  - Municipal unit: 70.79 km^{2} (27.33 sq mi)
- Elevation: 37 m (121 ft)

Population (2021)
  - Municipal unit: 2,378
  - Municipal unit density: 33.59/km^{2} (87.00/sq mi)
- Time zone: UTC+2 (EET)
  - Summer (DST): UTC+3 (EEST)
- Postal code: 270 58
- Area code: 26210
- Vehicle registration: ΗΑ
- Website: www.volakos.gov.gr

Volakas (Greek: Βώλακας) is a former municipality in Elis, West Greece, Greece. After the administrative reform of 2011, it became a part of Pyrgos. The municipal unit has an area of 70.790 km^{2}. Its seat of administration was in the town of Epitalio.

Volakas is situated on the Ionian Sea coast, southeast of Pyrgos and southwest of Olympia. The river Alfeios forms the northern border of the municipal unit. There are wooded hills in the northeastern part of Volakas, the southwestern part along the coast is flat and used for agriculture. The Greek National Road 9 (Patras - Pyrgos - Kyparissia) and the railway from Pyrgos to Kalamata run through Volakas. Operations at the small airport of Epitalio (ICAO: LGEP) have been suspended.

== Subdivisions ==
The municipal unit Volakas was subdivided into the following communities (constituent villages in brackets):

- Epitalio (Epitalio, Paralia)
- Agridi
- Alfeiousa
- Anemochori

== Historical population ==
Year	Population
1991	3,438
2001	3,552
2011	2,935
2021	2,378

== See also ==
- List of settlements in Elis
