= Salmoni, Elis =

Salmoni Σαλμώνη
- Community
- Location within Greece
- Coordinates: 37°40′N 21°32′E
- Country: Greece
- Administrative region: West Greece
- Regional unit: Elis
- Municipality: Pyrgos
- Municipal unit: Pyrgos

Population (2021)
  - Community: 462
- Time zone: UTC+2 (EET)
  - Summer (DST): UTC+3 (EEST)

Salmoni (Greek: Σαλμώνη, before 1915: Κούκουρα - Koukoura) is a village and a community in the municipality of Pyrgos, Elis, Greece. The community includes the village Alfeios. It is situated in low hills on the right bank of the river Alfeios, at 70 m elevation. It is 2 km southwest of Strefi, 3 km southeast of Varvasaina and 8 km east of Pyrgos. The Greek National Road 74 (Tripoli - Olympia - Pyrgos) passes north of the village. A previously independent community, Salmoni is part of Pyrgos since 1997. The current Greek Orthodox metropolitan of Thessaloniki, Anthimos, was born in Salmoni in 1934. The village Alfeios, 3 km west of Salmoni, has two churches, Metamorfoseos tou Sotiros and Saint Raphael.

== Population ==
Year	Population village	Population community
1981	715	-
1991	703	-
2001	801	840
2011	612	643
2021	449	462

== See also ==
- List of settlements in Elis
