= Epitalio =

Epitalio Επιτάλιο
- Community
- Location within Greece
- Coordinates: 37°37.6′N 21°29.6′E
- Country: Greece
- Administrative region: West Greece
- Regional unit: Elis
- Municipality: Pyrgos
- Municipal unit: Volakas
- Elevation: 37 m (121 ft)

Population (2021)
  - Community: 1,291
- Time zone: UTC+2 (EET)
  - Summer (DST): UTC+3 (EEST)
- Postal code: 270 58
- Area code: 26210
- Vehicle registration: ΗΑ

Epitalio (Greek: Επιτάλιο, before 1927: Αγουλινίτσα – Agoulinitsa) is a town and a community in Elis, Greece.

It was the seat of the former municipality of Volakas, which was merged into the municipality of Pyrgos under the major administrative reform of 2011. Epitalio is situated at the foot of low hills, 4 km from the Ionian Sea and 2 km from the river Alfeios. It is 7 km southeast of Pyrgos, 12 km west of Olympia and 12 km northwest of Krestena. Some places in the wider Epitalio area are located below sea level at −6 m elevation, the lowest point in Greece. The Greek National Road 9 (Patras – Pyrgos – Kyparissia) and the railway from Pyrgos to Kalamata run through Epitalio. The community consists of the town Epitalio and the beach village Paralia.

== Historical population ==
Year	Town	Community
1981	1,869	–
1991	1,752	–
2001	1,893	2,059
2011	1,469	1,495
2021	1,239	1,291

== History ==
Epitalio was named after the ancient Elean city Epitalium. Epitalium, identified by Strabo as the Homeric Thryon or Thryoessa, was situated on a hill near the ford of the river Alpheus. Its strategic position on the road along the Ionian Sea coast made it an important military post. The ancient ruins lie north of the present town.

== See also ==
- List of settlements in Elis
