= Myrtia, Elis =

Myrtia Μυρτιά
- Community
- Location within Greece
- Coordinates: 37°43′N 21°21′E
- Country: Greece
- Administrative region: West Greece
- Regional unit: Elis
- Municipality: Pyrgos
- Municipal unit: Pyrgos

Population (2021)
  - Community: 966
- Time zone: UTC+2 (EET)
  - Summer (DST): UTC+3 (EEST)

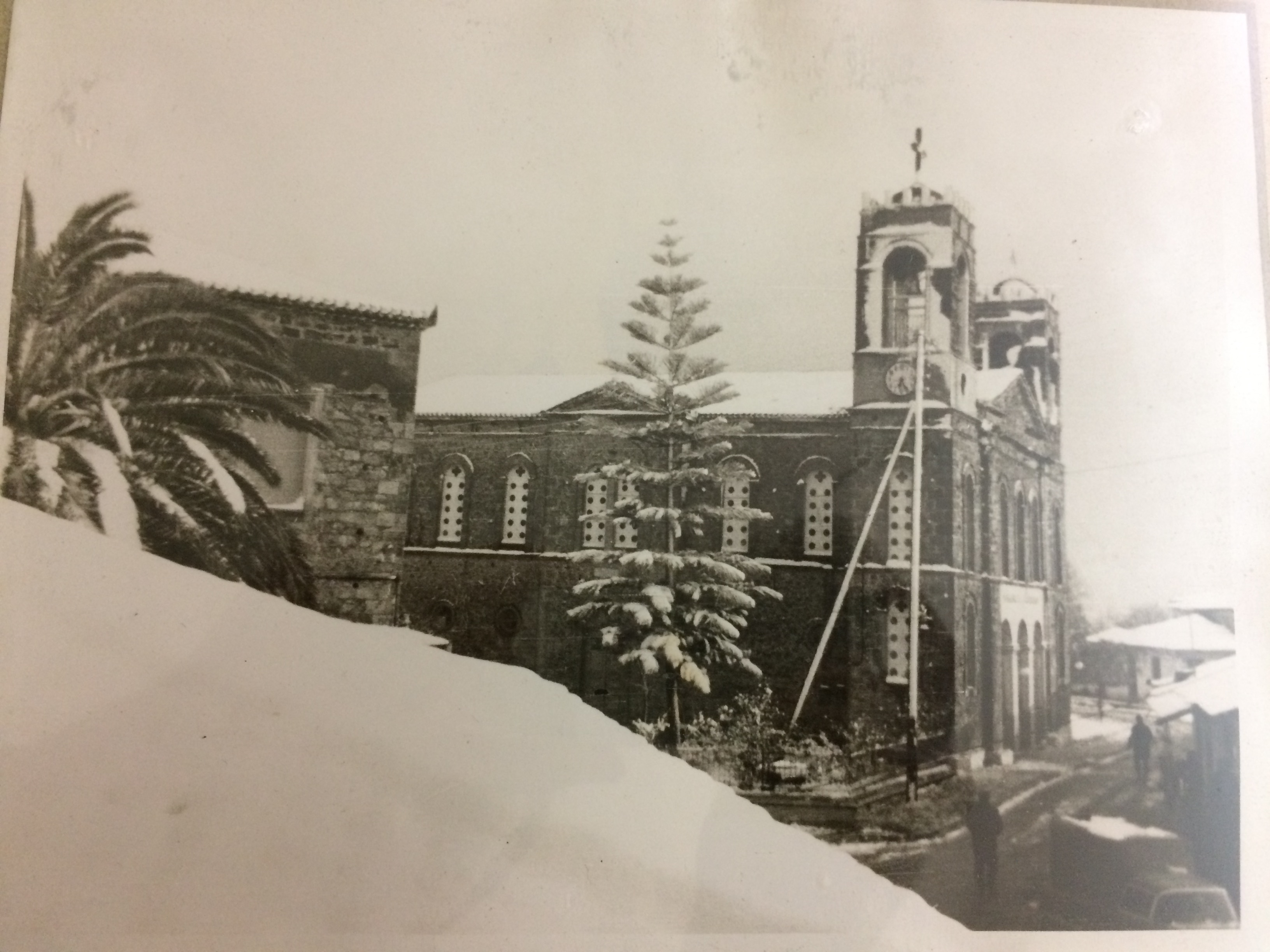
Myrtia church during heavy snowfall in 1968

Myrtia or Myrtea (Greek: Μυρτιά or Μυρτέα) is a village in the municipality of Pyrgos, Elis, Greece. It is located on a hillside near the Ionian Sea. It is 3 km southeast of Douneika, 3 km southwest of Alpochori, 3 km north of Skourochori and 9 km northwest of Pyrgos town centre. The Greek National Road 9/E55 (Patras - Pyrgos - Kyparissia) passes northeast of the village.

== Population ==
Year	Population
1981	915
1991	919
2001	788
2011	898
2021	966

== See also ==
- List of settlements in Elis
