= Pyrgos, Elis =

City in the Peloponnese, Greece

Pyrgos Πύργος
- Municipality
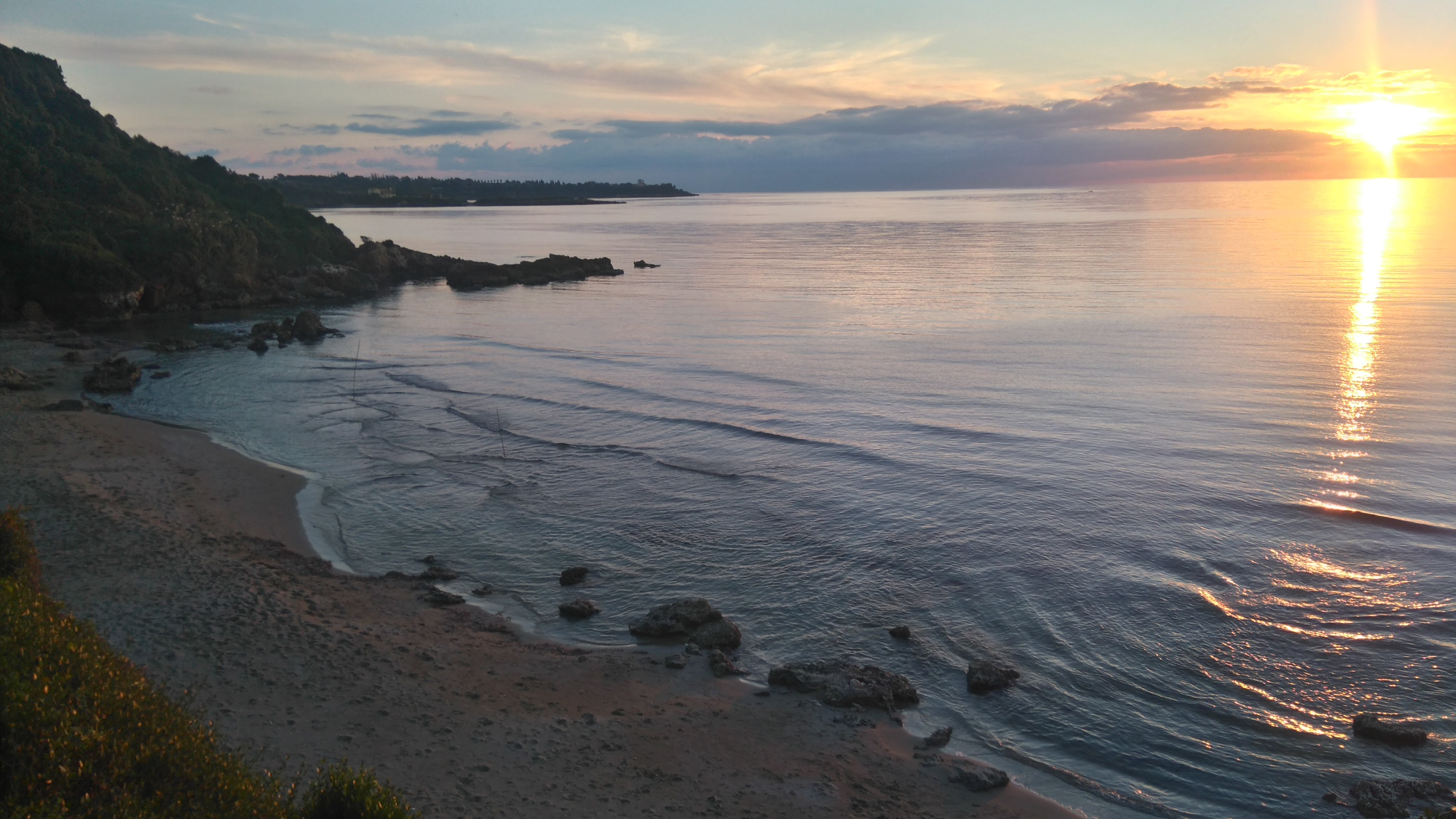
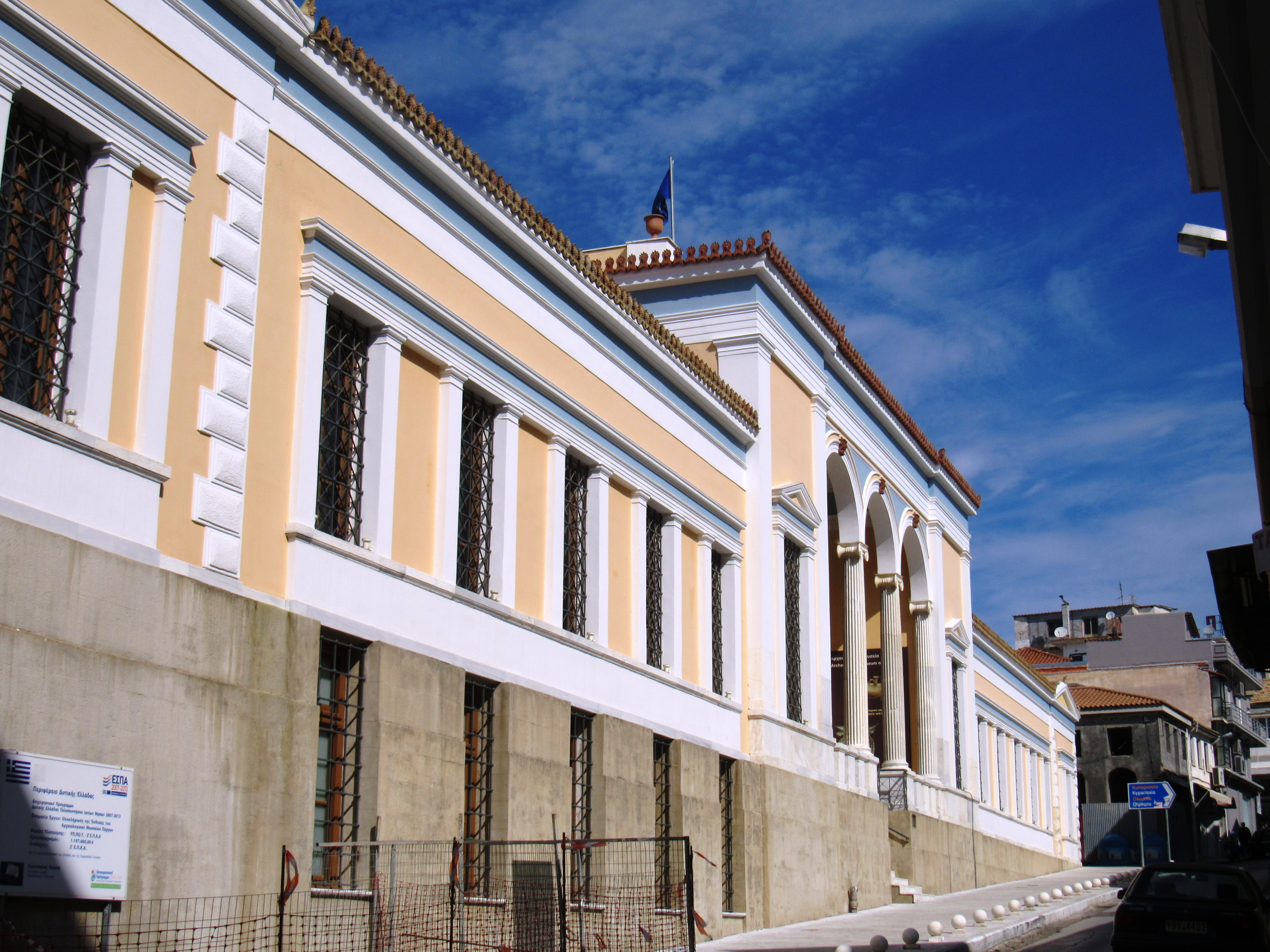
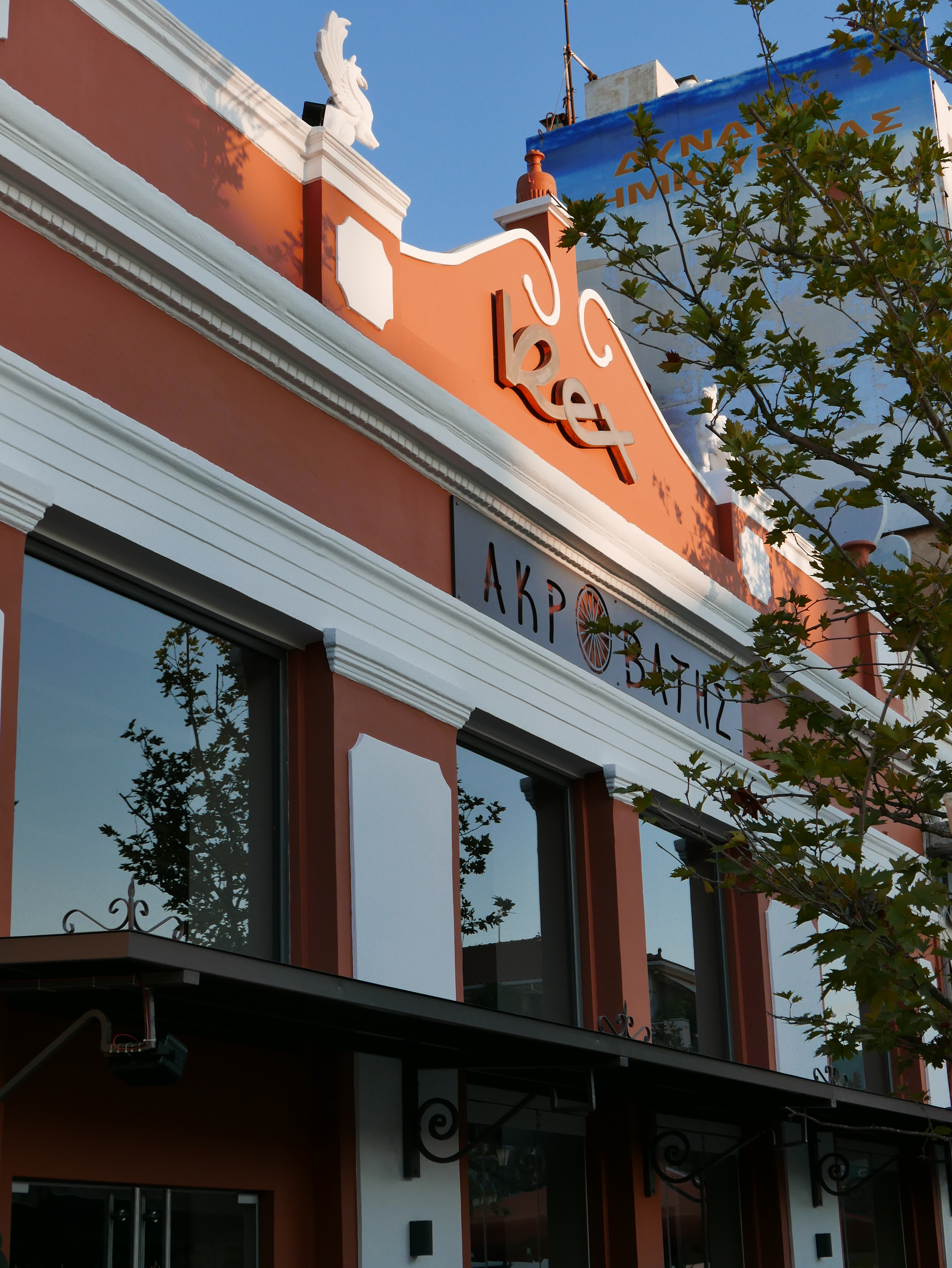
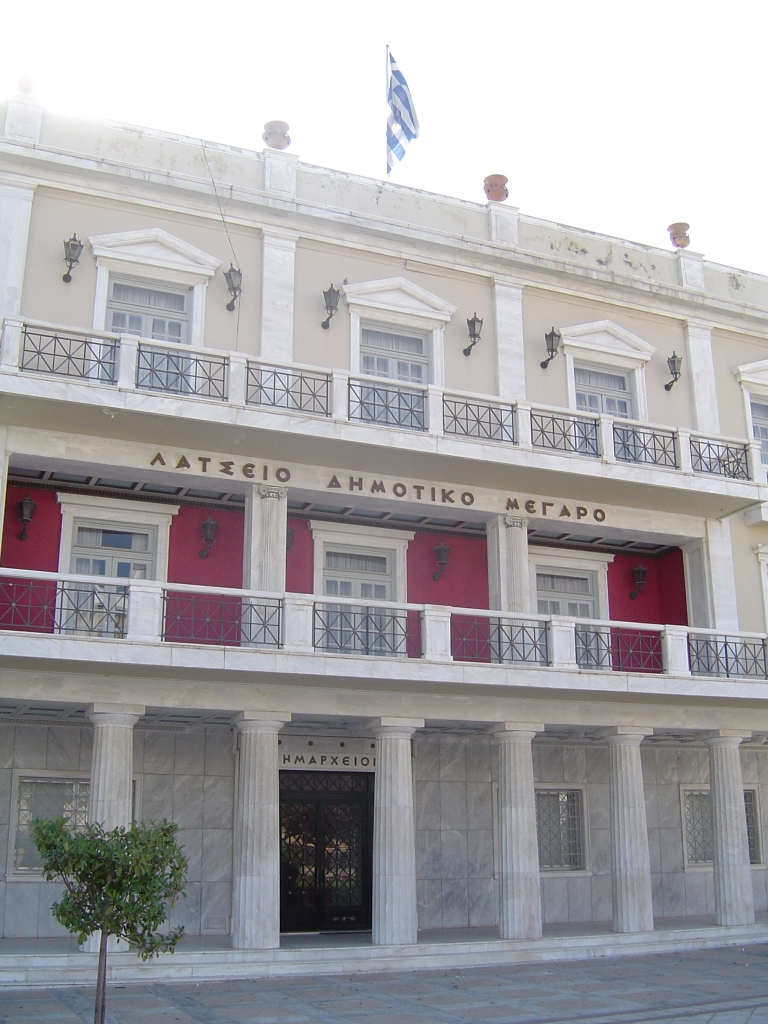
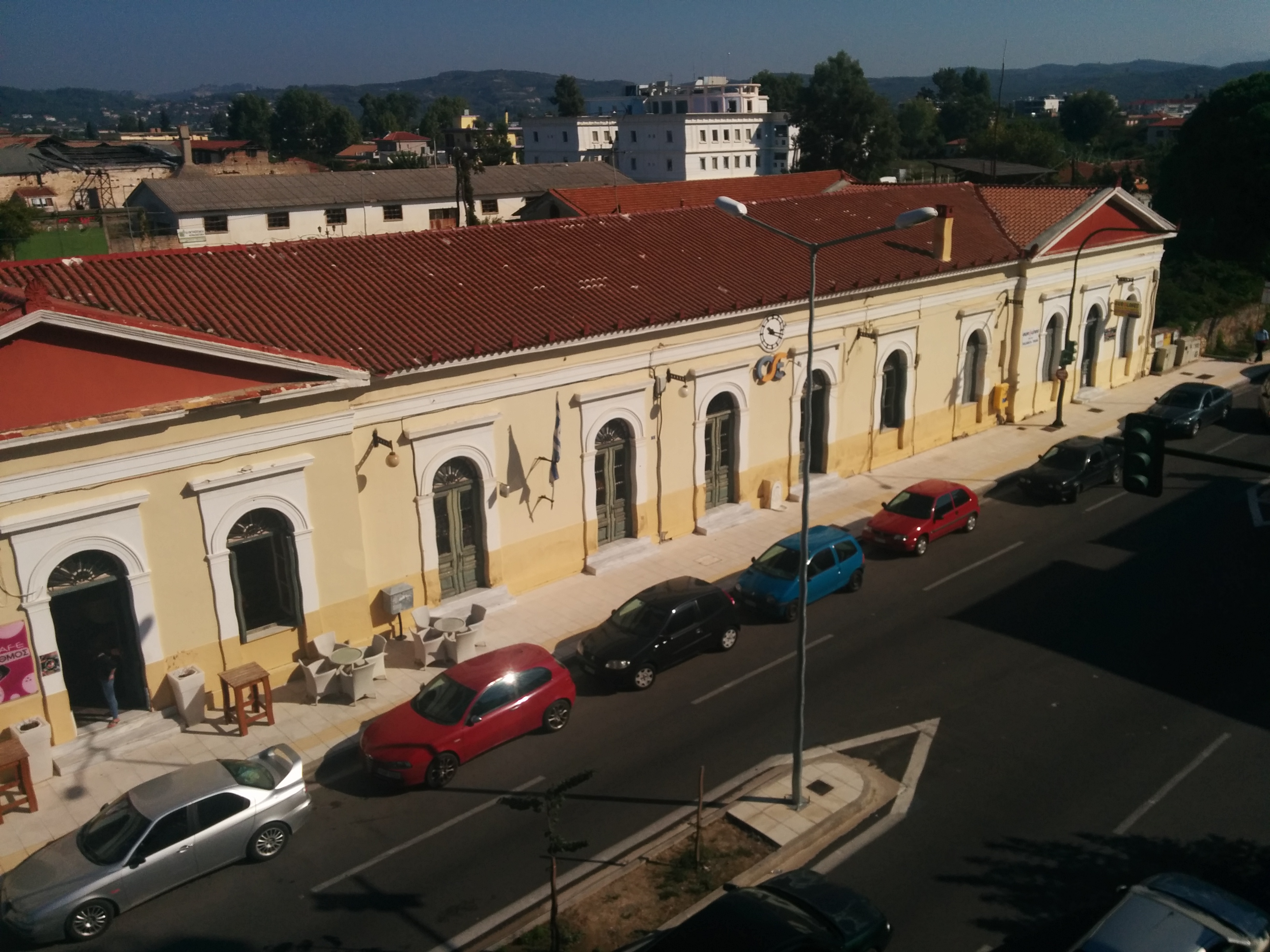
- Clockwise from top right: Municipal Market turned into the Archaeological Museum, Latseio town hall, Pyrgos railway station, Akrovatis cafe restaurant (former Rex Cinema), Skafidia Beach

- Seal

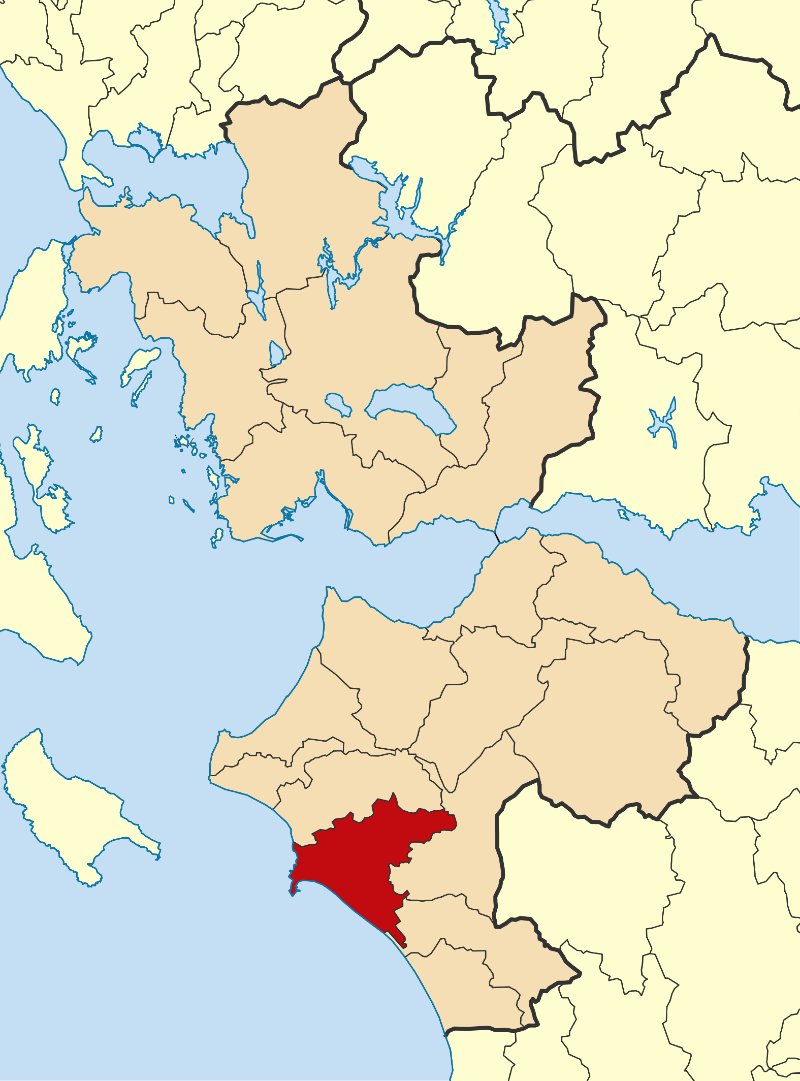

- Location within Greece
- Coordinates: 37°40′N 21°26′E
- Country: Greece
- Geographic region: Peloponnese
- Administrative region: West Greece
- Regional unit: Elis

Government
  - Mayor: Efstathios Kannis (since 2023)

Area
  - Municipality: 456.6 km^{2} (176.3 sq mi)
  - Municipal unit: 170.9 km^{2} (66.0 sq mi)
- Elevation: 15 m (49 ft)

Population (2021)
  - Municipality: 45,365
  - Density: 99.35/km^{2} (257.3/sq mi)
  - Municipal unit: 35,062
  - Municipal unit density: 205.2/km^{2} (531.4/sq mi)
  - Community: 26,052
- Time zone: UTC+2 (EET)
  - Summer (DST): UTC+3 (EEST)
- Postal code: 271 xx
- Area code: 26210
- Vehicle registration: HA
- Website: cityofpyrgos.gr

Pyrgos (Greek: Πύργος, romanized: Pýrgos, lit. 'tower') is a city in the northwestern Peloponnese, Greece, the capital of the regional unit of Elis and the seat of the Municipality of Pyrgos. The city is located in the middle of a plain, 4 kilometres (2 miles) from the Ionian Sea. The river Alfeios flows into sea about 7 km (4 mi) south of Pyrgos. The population of the town Pyrgos is 26,052, and of the municipality 45,365 (2021). Pyrgos is 16 km (10 mi) west of Olympia, 16 km (10 mi) southeast of Amaliada, 70 km (43 mi) southwest of Patras and 85 km (53 mi) west of Tripoli.

== Historical population ==
Year	Town population	Municipal unit population	Municipality population
1981	21,958	-	-
1991	28,465	39,183	-
2001	23,791	34,902	51,777
2011	25,180	35,572	47,995
2021	26,052	35,062	45,365

== Municipality ==
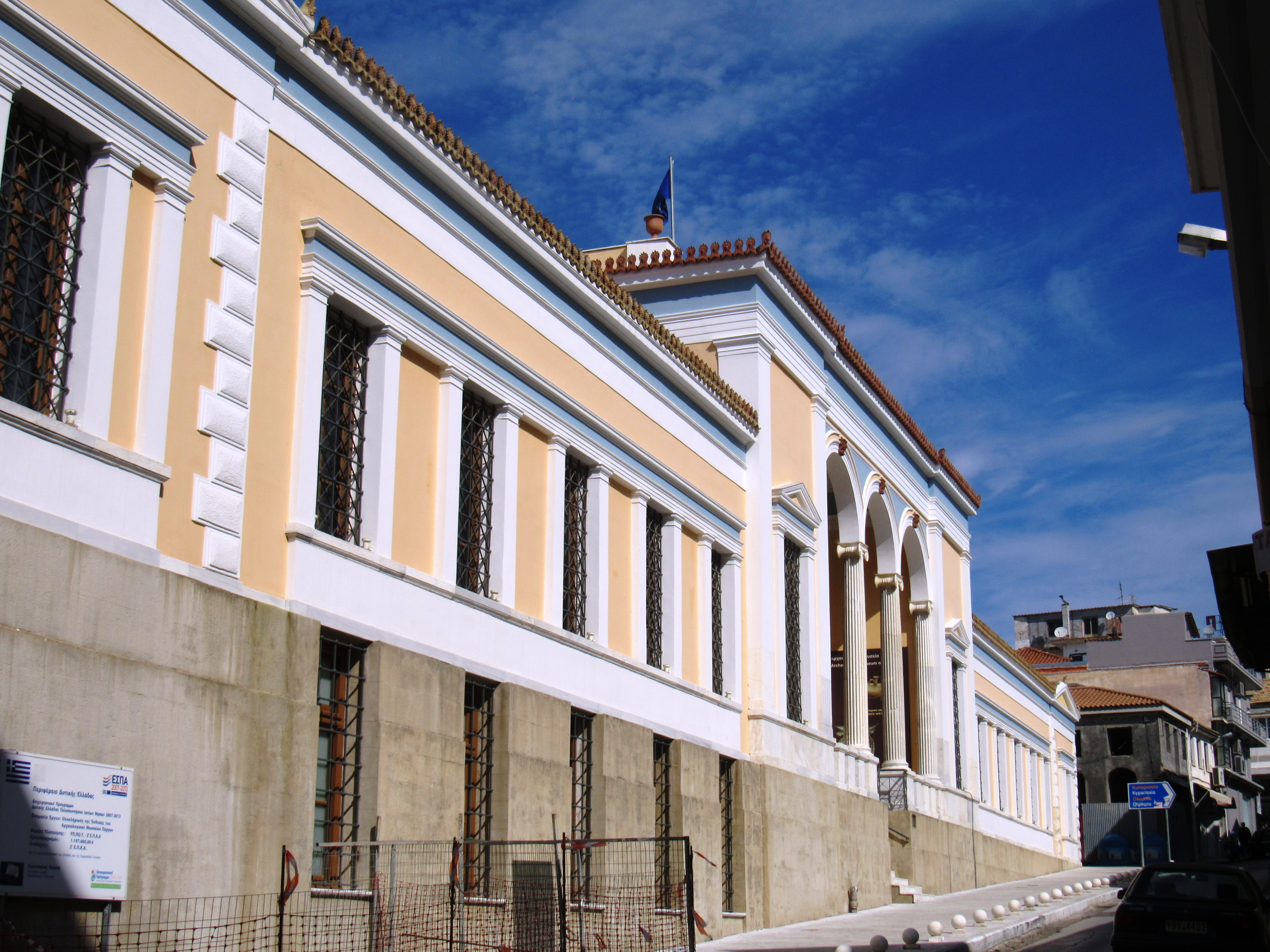
The municipal market, work by Ernst Ziller

The municipality Pyrgos was formed during the 2011 local government reform by the merger of the following 4 former municipalities, that became municipal units:

- Iardanos
- Oleni
- Pyrgos
- Volakas

The municipality has an area of 456.610 km^{2}, the municipal unit 170.866 km^{2}.

=== Subdivisions ===
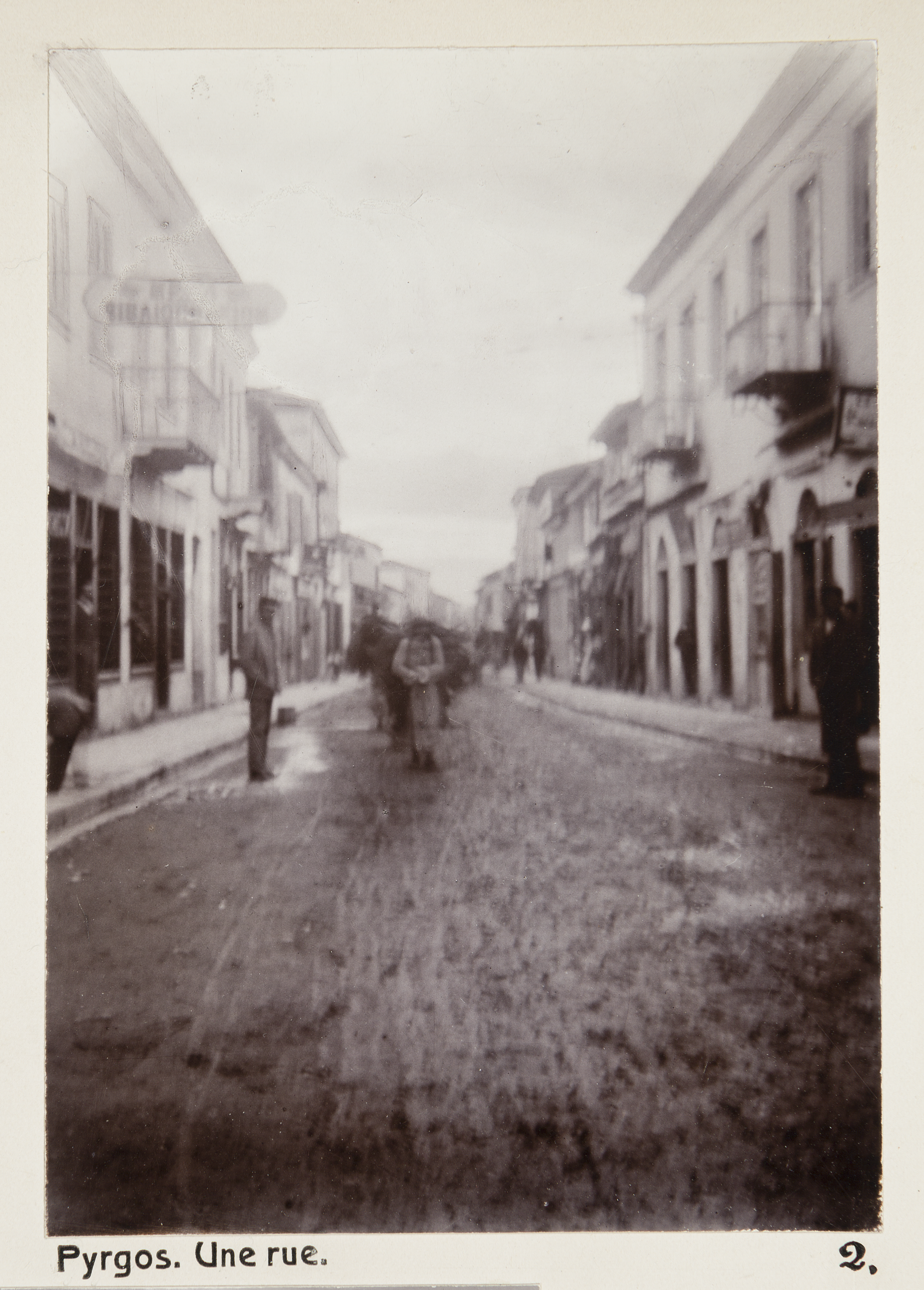
Pyrgos, 1896

The municipal unit of Pyrgos is divided into the following communities (settlements within the communities given in brackets):

- Pyrgos (Pyrgos, Anthopyrgos, Kavasilakia, Lampeti, Syntriada, Tragano)
- Agios Georgios
- Agios Ilias (Agios Ilias, Pyrgi, Stamatelaiika)
- Agios Ioannis (Agios Ioannis, Kyani Akti, Palatas, Tragano)
- Ampelonas (Ampelonas, Kouzouli, Rozeika)
- Elaionas (Elaionas, Vytinaiika)
- Granitsaiika (Granitsaiika, Kavouri)
- Katakolo (Katakolo, Agios Andreas)
- Koliri (Koliri, Kolireikes Paragkes)
- Korakochori (Korakochori, Agios Andreas, Kallithea, Bouka)
- Lasteika (Lasteika, Itia)
- Leventochori
- Myrtia
- Palaiovarvasaina (Palaiovarvasaina, Agios Georgios, Kampos)
- Salmoni (Salmoni, Alfeios)
- Skafidia (Skafidia, Kalakaiika, Moni Skafidias, Patronikoleika)
- Skourochori (Skourochori, Kato Kavouri)
- Varvasaina (Varvasaina, Kato Varvasaina)
- Vytinaiika

== History ==
=== History of the name ===
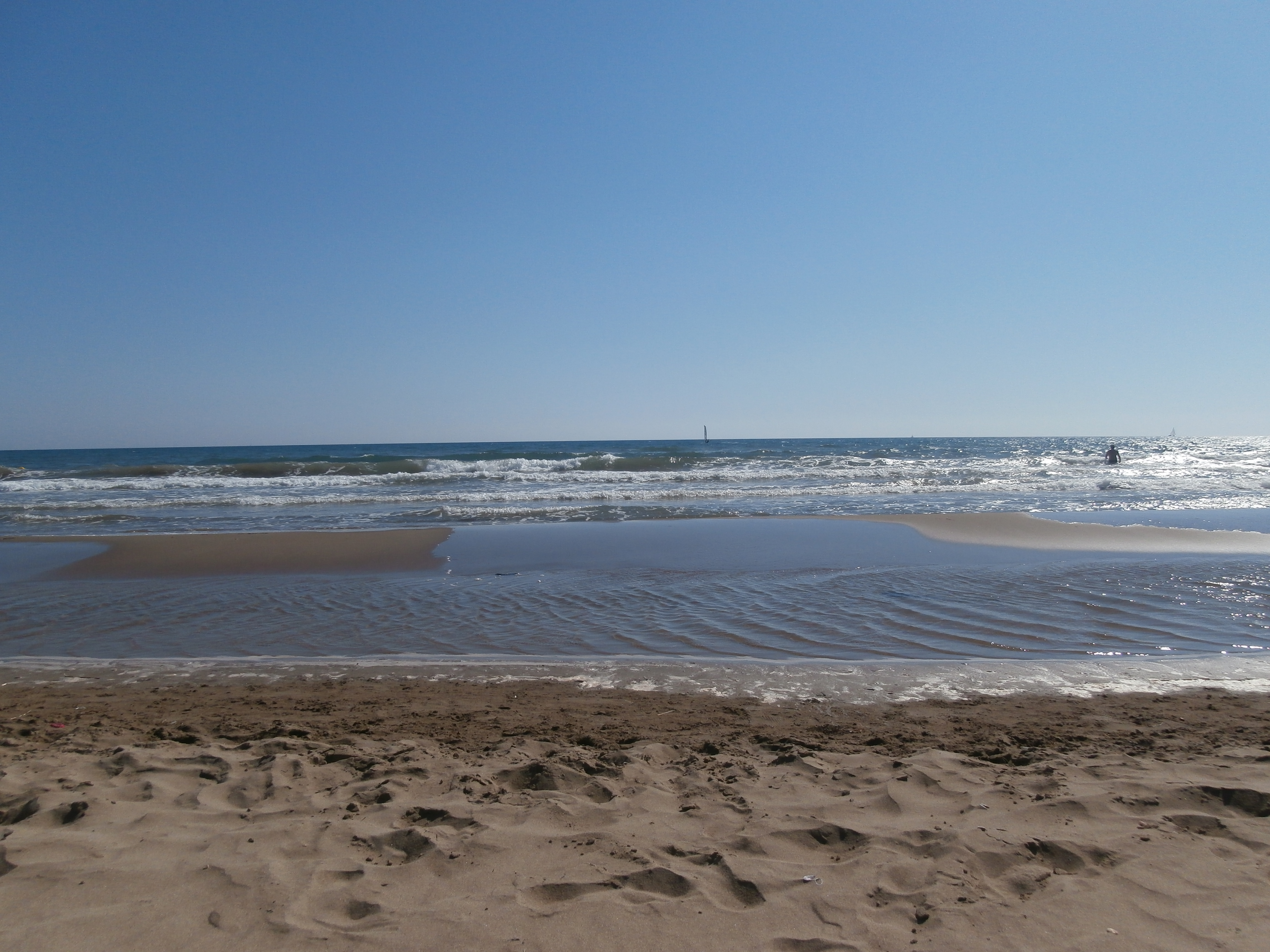
Beach of Pyrgos

In the 1510s, during Ottoman rule over Greece, a villager from Kalavryta decided to move and reform the area of Pyrgos which up until then was uncultivated. During this reformation he found in a well a large amount of gold ancient coins which he delivered to the Sultan as the rightful owner. The Sultan, Selim I (1470-1520), in order to honor his integrity named him ruler of the region (1512) and gave him a great acreage expanding from Alfeios river until the village Agios Ioannis which is located near Katakolo (the main port of the Elis region). This area was encompassing today's Pyrgos and was uninhabited. According to the stories the new ruler built a great tower (Πύργος, pyrgos in Greek) on a hill in order to supervise his fields and his flocks. This was the first settlement of the area. Pyrgos experienced significant urban and economic growth during the late 19th century, particularly due to the expansion of raisin exports from the western Peloponnese through the nearby port of Katakolo.

== Climate ==
Pyrgos has a hot-summer Mediterranean climate (Köppen climate classification: Csa) with hot and dry summers and rainy winters with generally mild temperatures. Annual precipitation is sizeable, like most of Western Greece, nearly 900 mm, while it peaks in late autumn.

Climate data for Pyrgos (1975-2010)
Month	Jan	Feb	Mar	Apr	May	Jun	Jul	Aug	Sep	Oct	Nov	Dec	Year
Mean daily maximum °C (°F)	14.7 (58.5)	15.0 (59.0)	17.2 (63.0)	20.0 (68.0)	24.8 (76.6)	29.1 (84.4)	32.0 (89.6)	32.2 (90.0)	29.0 (84.2)	24.8 (76.6)	19.5 (67.1)	15.9 (60.6)	22.8 (73.1)
Daily mean °C (°F)	9.7 (49.5)	10.2 (50.4)	12.3 (54.1)	15.3 (59.5)	19.9 (67.8)	24.1 (75.4)	26.7 (80.1)	26.4 (79.5)	23.1 (73.6)	18.8 (65.8)	14.2 (57.6)	11.0 (51.8)	17.6 (63.8)
Mean daily minimum °C (°F)	5.1 (41.2)	5.3 (41.5)	6.6 (43.9)	9.0 (48.2)	12.4 (54.3)	15.5 (59.9)	17.5 (63.5)	17.9 (64.2)	15.7 (60.3)	12.7 (54.9)	9.4 (48.9)	6.9 (44.4)	11.2 (52.1)
Average rainfall mm (inches)	129.7 (5.11)	104.4 (4.11)	71.5 (2.81)	52.9 (2.08)	26.8 (1.06)	7.7 (0.30)	3.6 (0.14)	10.8 (0.43)	39.4 (1.55)	102.1 (4.02)	177.6 (6.99)	164.0 (6.46)	890.5 (35.06)
Average rainy days	12.0	11.2	8.9	8.9	4.8	1.6	0.5	1.0	4.3	7.4	11.5	13.4	85.5
Average relative humidity (%)	73.6	71.9	69.0	70.3	67.7	62.3	58.7	62.0	66.7	71.2	74.9	75.3	68.6
Mean monthly sunshine hours	143.2	147.4	193.4	227.2	285.3	332.3	360.4	333.9	263.6	215.2	152.5	124.9	2,779.3
Source: HNMS, Sunshine 1975-1997

== Transportation ==
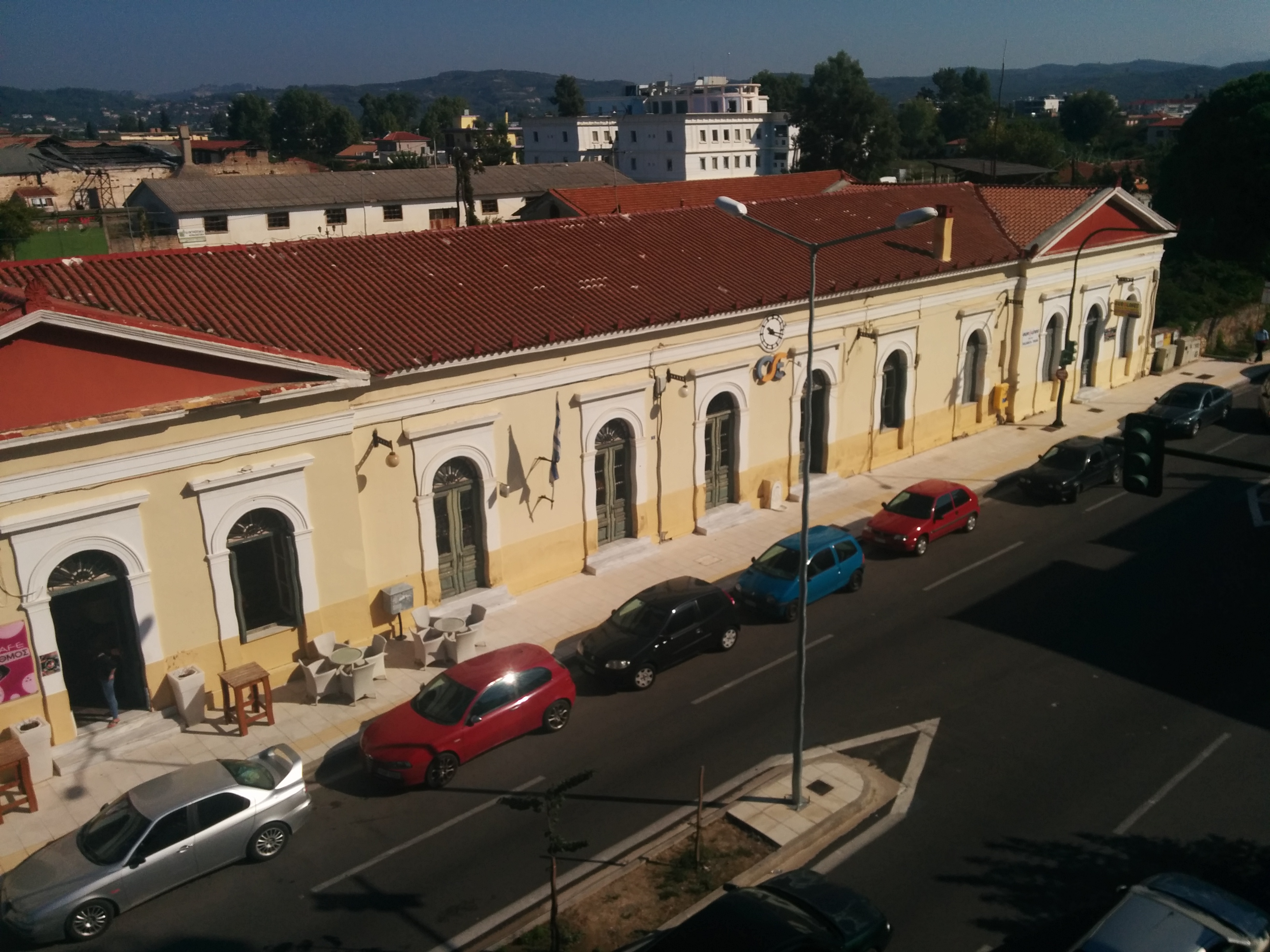
The railway station, another work by Ernst Ziller

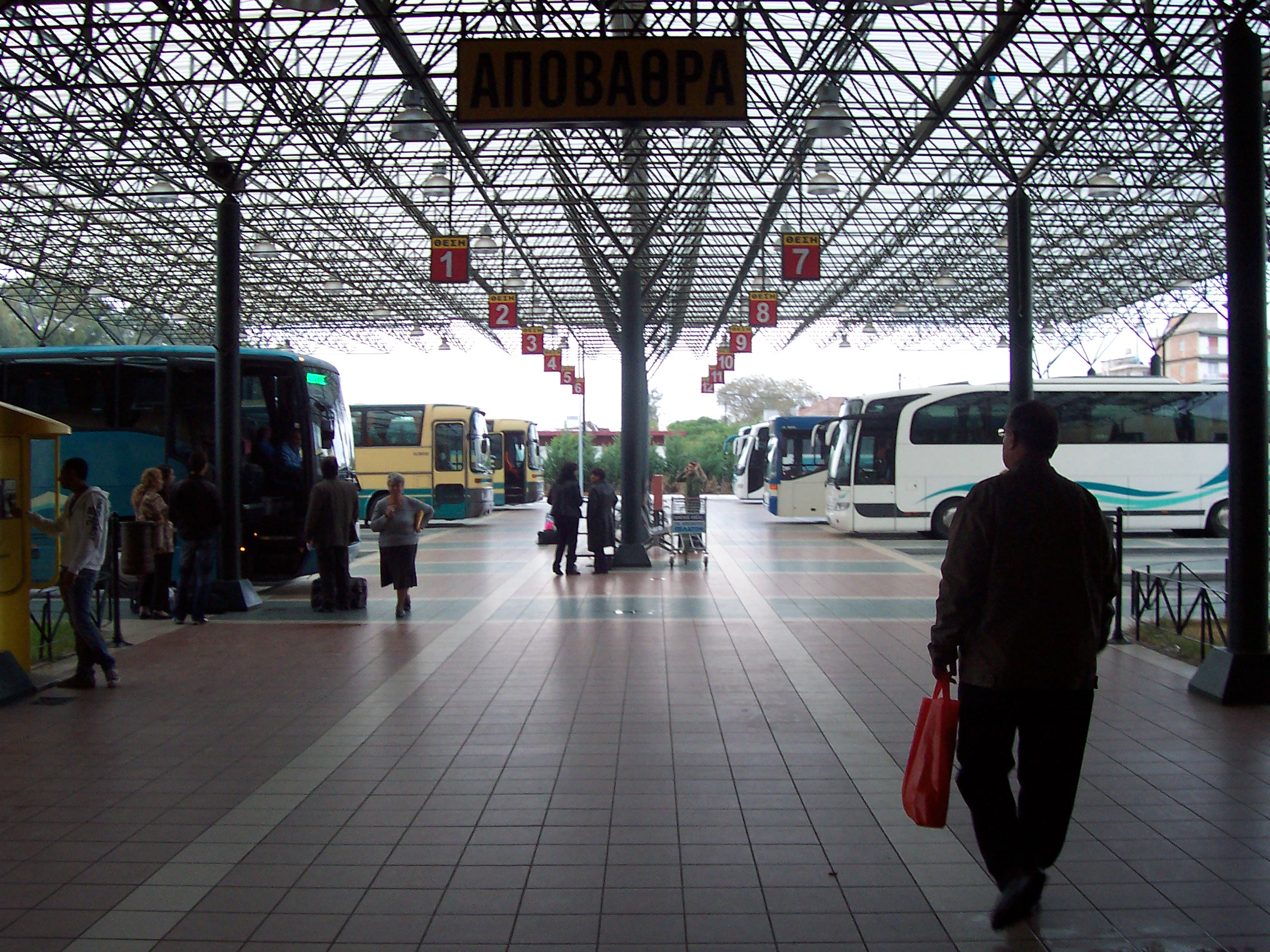
The bus terminal in Pyrgos.

Pyrgos has a train station with regular trains to the port of Katakolo and Olympia. Service on the line from Patras to Kalamata via Pyrgos has been suspended in 2011. Pyrgos has a bus terminal, served by KTEL Ileias, with regular buses for the regional routes to most places in Elis as well as for intercity routes to Athens and to larger cities such as Patras, Kalamata, Ioannina and Thessaloniki. The Greek National Road 9 connects Pyrgos with Patras and Kyparissia, the Greek National Road 74 run from Pyrgos to Tripoli via Olympia. The nearest airport is located in Andravida near the town of Amaliada but it is served for military operations only. However, there are plans to open passenger operations in the next years. The alternative airports for passenger operations are Araxos airport, located in the province of Aichaia about 60 km to the north-east or Kalamata Captain Vasilios Constatakopoulos airport, in Messinia province near Kalamata about 120 km south of the city.

== Education ==
Department of Museum Studies of the university of Patras was based in the city.

== Sporting teams ==
- Paniliakos F.C. (played in the first division for the last time during the 2003–2004 season)
- PAS Pyrgos (plays in the second division during the 2026–2027 season)

== Notable people ==
- Andreas Avgerinos (1820–1895), politician
- Petros Avgerinos (19th century), politician, mayor of Pyrgos
- Nakis Avgerinos (1911–2002), politician
- Giorgos Karagounis (1977–), footballer
- Kostas Kazakos (1935–2022), actor and politician
- George Pavlopoulos (1924–2008), poet
- Takis Sinopoulos (1917–1981), poet
- Stephanos Stephanopoulos (1898–1982), politician and President of the Hellenic Republic
- Theodoros Xydis, (1909–1985), poet and essayist.
- Sakis Karagiorgas (1930–1985), professor in Panteion University
- Emmanouil Karalis (1999-), athlete of Pole Vault, Olympic Medalist in Athletics at the 2024 Summer Olympics in Paris

== See also ==
- List of settlements in Elis
