= Neochori, Zacharo =

Neochori Νεοχώρι
- Community
- Location within Greece
- Coordinates: 37°26.1′N 21°39.4′E
- Country: Greece
- Administrative region: West Greece
- Regional unit: Elis
- Municipality: Zacharo
- Municipal unit: Zacharo
- Elevation: 10 m (33 ft)

Population (2021)
  - Community: 363
- Time zone: UTC+2 (EET)
  - Summer (DST): UTC+3 (EEST)
- Postal code: 270 54
- Area code: 26250

Neochori (Greek: Νεοχώρι) is a village in the municipality of Zacharo, southern Elis, Greece. It is situated on the Gulf of Kyparissia, a part of the Ionian Sea. The foothills of the Minthi are east of the village. Neochori is 3 km southeast of Kakovatos, 5 km northwest of Giannitsochori and 6 km south of Zacharo. The Greek National Road 9/E55 (Pyrgos - Kyparissia) and the railway from Pyrgos to Kalamata run east of the village.

== Historical population ==
Year	Population
1981	309
1991	426
2001	401
2011	345
2021	363

== See also ==
- List of settlements in Elis
