= Battle of the Olive Grove of Kountouras =

Battle of the Fourth Crusade

- Part of the Fourth Crusade
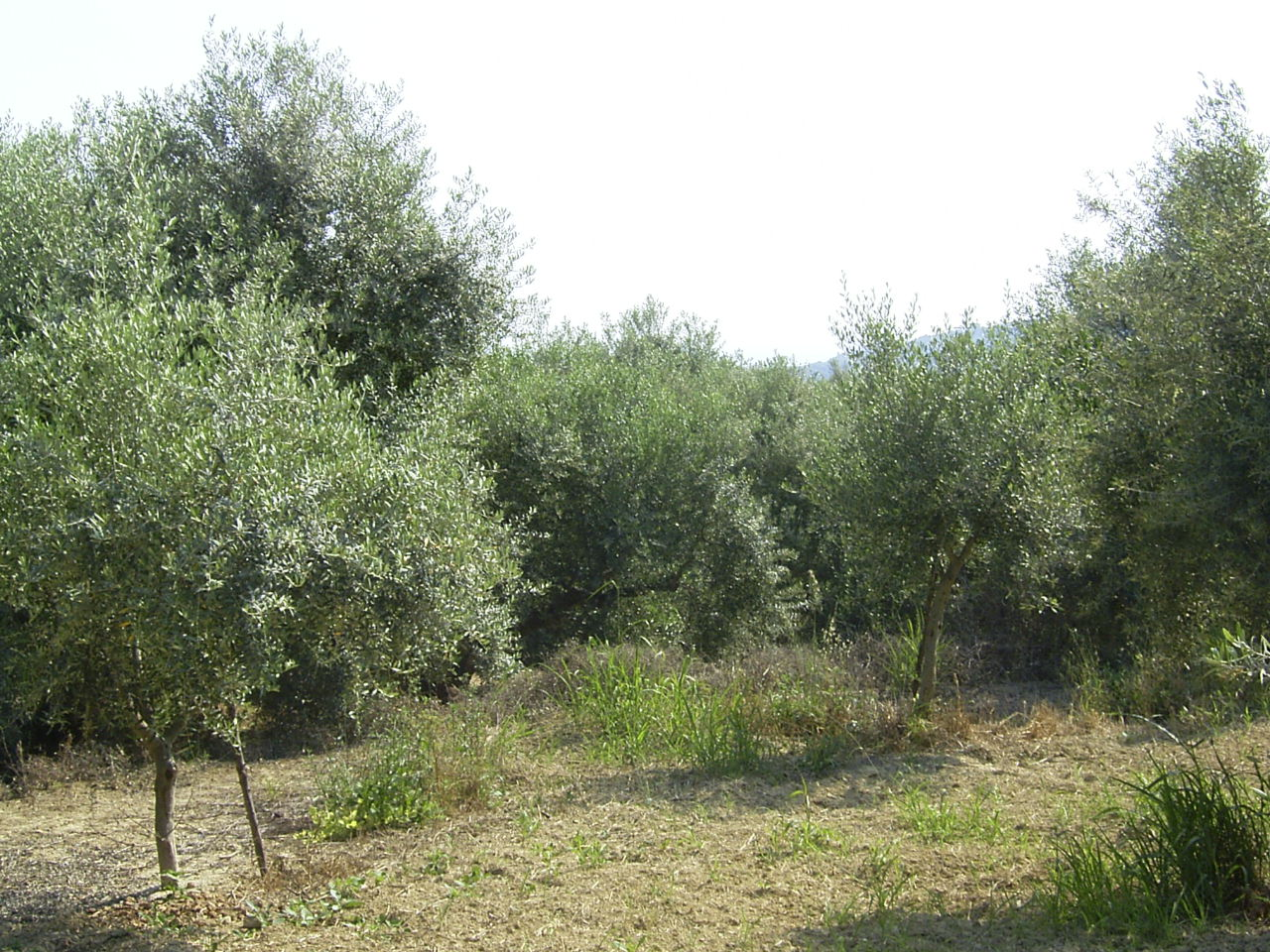
- An olive grove in Greece
Date	Summer, 1205
Location	Messenia, Peloponnese
Result	Frankish victory
Territorial changes	Franks found the Principality of Achaea

Belligerents
Frankish Crusaders	local Greeks and Melingoi

Commanders and leaders
William of Champlitte; Geoffrey I of Villehardouin	Michael I Komnenos Doukas

Strength
500 or 700 foot and horse	c. 4,000 or 5,000 foot and horse

Casualties and losses
Light	Heavy

The Battle of the Olive Grove of Kountouras took place in the summer of 1205, in Messenia in the Morea peninsula, between the Frankish Crusaders and the local Byzantine Greeks, resulting in a victory of the Franks and the collapse of the local resistance.

In 1204, Constantinople, the capital city of the Byzantine Empire was taken by the Crusaders of the Fourth Crusade and the Republic of Venice. This led to the collapse of the Byzantine Empire and the establishment of the Latin Empire and other Crusader states in Greece.

Meanwhile, a Crusader force of between 500 and 700 knights and infantry under the command of William of Champlitte and Geoffrey I of Villehardouin advanced into the Morea to deal with Byzantine resistance. In the olive grove of Kountouras in Messenia, they confronted an army of around 4,000–5,000 local Greeks and Slavs under the command of a certain Michael, sometimes identified with Michael I Komnenos Doukas, the founder of the Despotate of Epirus. In the ensuing battle, the Crusaders emerged victorious, forcing the Byzantines to retreat and crushing resistance in the Morea. This battle paved the way for the foundation of the Principality of Achaea.

== Background ==
The army of the Fourth Crusade conquered Constantinople on 12 April 1204. One of the main leaders of the crusade, Boniface of Montferrat, having lost the opportunity to become the new Latin emperor of Constantinople, went on to found the Kingdom of Thessalonica. That autumn, Boniface campaigned south into Greece, where he defeated the local magnate Leo Sgouros and drove him back to his strongholds of Nauplia and Acrocorinth in the northeastern Morea (Peloponnese), which were besieged by the Crusaders. During the siege of Nauplia, Boniface was met by Geoffrey I of Villehardouin, who persuaded him to launch the conquest of the rest of the Morea.

Eager to share in the spoils of the Fourth Crusade, Villehardouin had left the Holy Land and sailed for Constantinople. His ship was blown off course, and he landed at Modon (Methoni) on the southwestern tip of the Morea peninsula. There Villehardouin had entered the service of a local Greek magnate against his rivals, and had gained the impression that the country was easy to take. When the magnate died, his son broke off the alliance with him, but Villehardouin, learning that the Crusaders under Boniface were besieging Nauplia, set out to seek his aid. Boniface sought to retain him in his own service, but Villehardouin teamed up with his fellow Champenois, William of Champlitte, whom he enticed with tales of the richness of the land and with a pledge to recognize him as his lord. Boniface finally sanctioned their undertaking, and in charge of around a hundred knights and several soldiers, Champlitte and Villehardouin set out together to conquer the Morea.

The towns of Patras and Andravida in the northwest fell without struggle, and at the latter Champlitte received the homage of the local magnates and people of the Skorta and Mesarea in the central Morea. From there the Franks moved south along the western coast, accompanied by a fleet, easily taking the fortress of Pontikon, which they repaired and garrisoned. They bypassed the strong fortress of Arkadia (Kyparissia), and passing through Navarino, arrived at Modon. They repaired the fortress walls, long ago torn down by the Venetians to stop its use as a pirate base, and assaulted the nearby fort of Coron, which fell after a single day, and the town of Kalamata, which surrendered.

== Battle ==
Map of the Morea (Peloponnese) in the Middle Ages

At this point, the Greeks of Laconia and Arcadia, under the leadership of a certain Michael, tried to stop the Franks at the olive grove of Kountouras in northeastern Messenia. Modern scholars have traditionally identified this Michael with Michael I Komnenos Doukas, founder of the Despotate of Epirus, but this identification has been questioned more recently by Raymond-Joseph Loenertz, as the fragile nature of his control over Epirus would have made a departure to aid the Moreote Greeks a major and unlikely gamble.

The events of the conquest are narrated by two sources, the various versions of the Chronicle of the Morea, and On the Conquest of Constantinople, by the Crusader Geoffrey of Villehardouin (uncle of Geoffrey I). According to the Chronicle, the Franks had 700 soldiers on horse and on foot, while the Greeks had 4,000, both mounted and on foot. The Greeks are described as "the Romans in Nikli, those of Veligosti, and those of Lakedaemonia", and it is remarked that most of the infantry was provided by the Melingoi, the Slavic tribe living in Mount Taygetos. The elder Villehardouin states that the army of Michael (who is not mentioned by the Chronicle) numbered over 5,000 men, and that of the Franks little above 500 mounted troops. The two sources also differ in the exact chronology of events, with the Chronicle placing the battle after the Frankish capture of Kalamata, and the elder Villehardouin after the seizure of Modon. In any case, despite being outnumbered, the Franks, after a march of a single day, confronted the Greeks and won the battle, no details for which are given; the Chronicle simply states that "The Franks won the battle at that time; they killed them all, few escaped them".

The exact location of the olive grove of Kountouras in Messenia is unknown. The Greek version of the Chronicle records, apart from the owner's name (Kountouras or the variant form Koundouron), a location named Kepeskianous (Κηπησκιάνους), while a variant form is recorded as Kapsikia (Καψικία). Efforts have been made to identify the locality, with some linking it with the modern village of Kapsia west of Mantinea in Arcadia, but this is too far from the reported area of the battle based on the sources, and furthermore olive trees do not grow in the region.

== Aftermath ==
The Battle of the Olive Grove of Kountouras was decisive for the conquest of the Morea by the Franks, as it represented the last general effort of the local Greeks to resist. The eminent historian of Frankish Greece, William Miller, likened the battle to a "Hastings of the Morea", writing that the "fate of the Morea, like that of Saxon England, was decided by a single pitched battle".

After their victory, the Crusaders rested for a while in the rich plain of Messenia. Champlitte called a council of war to determine their future strategy, and sent the fleet, which until then had accompanied them, home. In late 1205 or 1206, the Crusaders went on to capture Arkadia, whose siege lasted for some time, as well as the fortress of Araklovon, whose resistance was led by the celebrated warrior Doxapatres Voutsaras. By this time, the entire northern and western parts of the peninsula was under the rule of Champlitte. The northeast belonged to the Duchy of Athens under the suzerainty of Boniface of Montferrat, although Leo Sgouros and his men still held out in their two fortresses; and Laconia and the mountainous areas of the Taygetos and of Tsakonia remained still unsubdued. Nevertheless, the first stage of the Frankish conquest was complete, establishing a new Crusader state, the Principality of Achaea, and in a letter of Pope Innocent III on 19 November 1205, Champlitte is styled princeps totius Achaiae provincie.

== Sources ==
- Bon, Antoine (1969). La Morée franque. Recherches historiques, topographiques et archéologiques sur la principauté d'Achaïe [The Frankish Morea. Historical, Topographic and Archaeological Studies on the Principality of Achaea] (in French). Paris: De Boccard.
- Fine, John V. A. (1994) [1987]. The Late Medieval Balkans: A Critical Survey from the Late Twelfth Century to the Ottoman Conquest. Ann Arbor, Michigan: University of Michigan Press. ISBN 978-0-472-10079-8.
- Loenertz, Raymond-Joseph (1973). "Aux origines du despotat d'Épire et de la principauté d'Achaïe". Byzantion (in French). 43: 360–394.
- Longnon, Jean (1969) [1962]. "The Frankish States in Greece, 1204–1311". In Setton, Kenneth M.; Wolff, Robert Lee; Hazard, Harry W. (eds.). A History of the Crusades, Volume II: The Later Crusades, 1189–1311. Vol. 2 (Second ed.). Madison, Milwaukee, and London: University of Wisconsin Press. pp. 234–275. ISBN 0-299-04844-6.
- Lurier, Harold E., ed. (1964). Crusaders as Conquerors: The Chronicle of Morea. New York and London: Columbia University Press. LCCN 62-9367.
- Miller, William (1908). The Latins in the Levant: A History of Frankish Greece (1204–1566). London: John Murray.
