= Kaiafas =

Thermal springs near Zacharo, Greece

Coordinates: 37°31′N 21°36′E

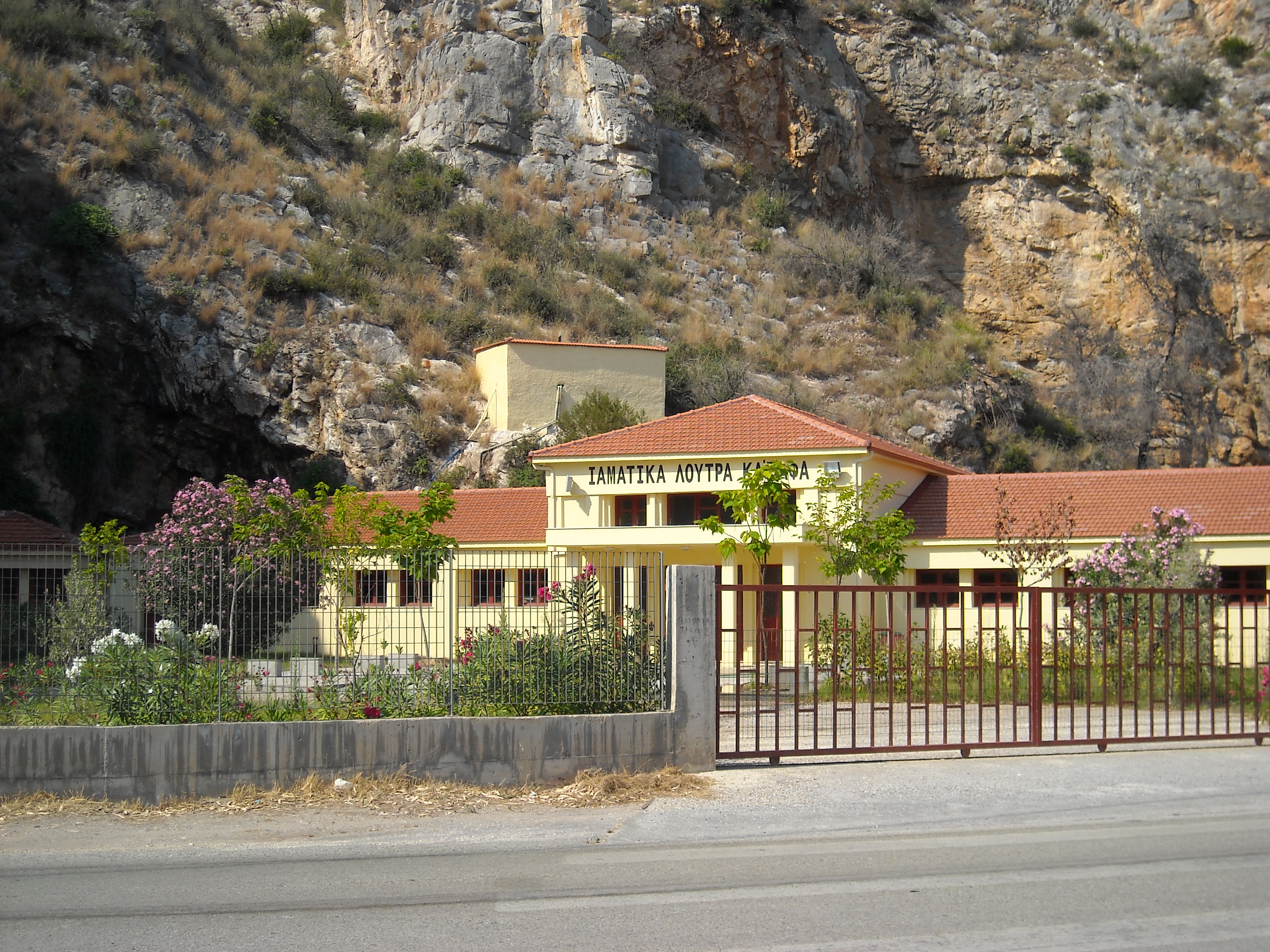
The spa facility in Kaiafas

Kaiafas or the thermal springs of Kaiafas (Greek, Modern: Καϊάφας) is a spa in the municipality of Zacharo in southwestern Greece. It is located 347 kilometres (216 miles) SW of Athens, 30 km (19 miles) SE of Pyrgos, 20 km (12 mi) S of Olympia, nearly 32 km (20 miles) N of Kyparissia and some 90 km (56 miles) NW of Kalamata.

== Healing and medical properties ==
The thermal springs of Kaiafas is a geological formation that consists of two springs located inside a naturally formed cave in the foot of the mountainLapithas. The water comes out at a temperature of 32-34 °C of the spring contains an important concentration of sulfur compounds, notably Magnesium Sulphate and Calcium Sulphate, and is also rich in minerals.

It has been reputed since ancient times to have therapeutic properties, and it has indeed been medically attested to be of a curative character for musculoskeletal diseases and conditions. There is a spa facility exactly outside of the cave's mouth. Furthermore, the spring at the cave Gerani is also indicated for positherapy.

== Natural location ==
The site of Kaiafas thermal springs is endowed with a beautiful natural environment, nowadays protected under the NATURA 2000 regime. A lake opens up at the mouth of the cave and the tourist facilities, notably the thermal hotel Olympia, is built on an islet within the Kaiafas Lake.

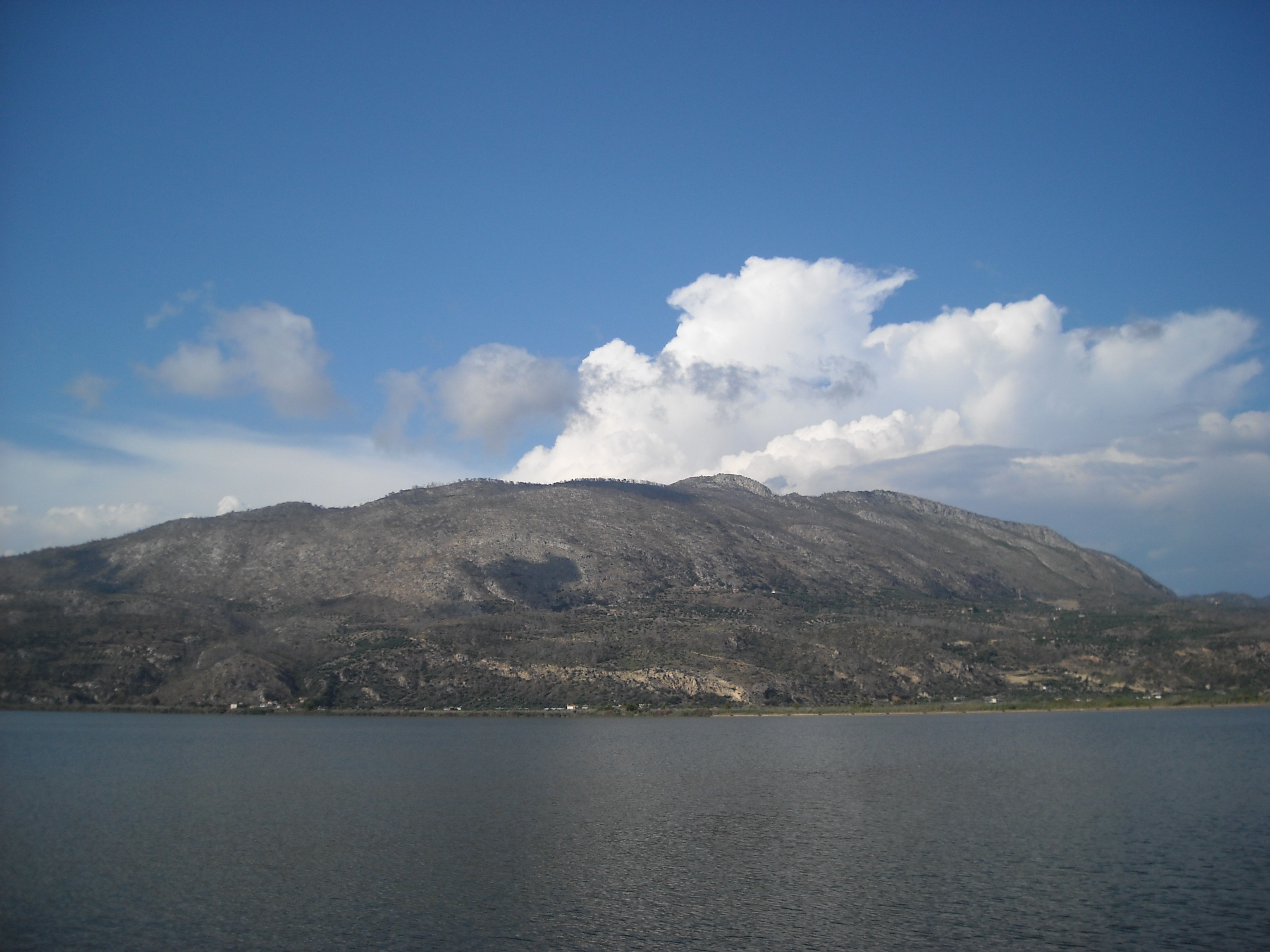
The mount Lapithas from where the spring just out

A zone of pine forest, in which the Pinus halepensis pine species prevails, separates the lake from the sandy, 3.5 km long beach, which adds enormously to the touristic value of the site. Furthermore, the site is located to the south of Ilia prefecture, only 25 km from ancient Olympia, a major archaeological site of Greece and a World Heritage cultural property.

== History and mythology ==
The river and cave area has been a tourist attraction for millennia, originally being the center of the myth of the Anigrides, to whom people would pray, and bathe in their waters in order to cure afflictions like leprosy. As mentioned above, the springs were visited already in antiquity; however, we have no known mention of them in Byzantine times or in the Ottoman period. They were used again after the foundation of the Modern Greek State, whereas the first facilities were built in 1907, when the construction of a railway connecting the site to the city and port of Patras made it possible from people to visit from afar. Between 1960 and 1999 the premises were under the tutelage of the Hellenic Tourism Organisation; in 2000 they came under the Public Properties' Enterprise and in 2007-2008 they were refurbished to properly serve the standards of a modern clientele.

== Nearest places ==
- Zacharo (SE)

== Historical population ==
Year	Population
1991	35
2001	114

== See also ==
- List of settlements in Elis
