= Stasio =

Stasio may refer to:

- Stasio, Greece
- A Polish language diminutive from 'Stanislav'
- Stasio (surname)

Stasio is a village and its meaning comes from the Greek word 'stasi' or rest or resting area, it was a midpoint to the mountain Elias so people used this as a resting area before continuing the journey up the mountain.
