= Minthe (disambiguation) =

Minthe is a water nymph in Greek mythology.

Minthe or Minthi may also refer to:

- Minthi, a village in Elis, Greece
- Minthi (mountain), a mountain in Elis, Greece
- Mentha, a genus of flowering plants, including several mint

== See also ==
- Menthe (disambiguation)
