= Sami, Greece =

There are two places named Sami in Greece:

- Sami, Cephalonia, a municipality and town on the island of Cephalonia
  - Sami Bay
- Sami (ancient city), in Elis
