= Terpsithea =

Terpsithea may refer to the following places in Greece:

- Terpsithea, Messenia, part of Kyparissia, Peloponnese
- Terpsithea, Glyfada, part of Glyfada, Attica
- Terpsithea, village in Aetolia-Acarnania, Western Greece
- A neighborhood of Stavroupoli, near Thessaloniki
