= Figaleia =

Figaleia Φιγαλεία
- Municipal unit
- Location within the regional unit

- Location within Greece
- Coordinates: 37°24′N 21°51′E
- Country: Greece
- Administrative region: West Greece
- Regional unit: Elis
- Municipality: Zacharo

Area
  - Municipal unit: 89.18 km^{2} (34.43 sq mi)

Population (2021)
  - Municipal unit: 1,250
  - Municipal unit density: 14.0/km^{2} (36.3/sq mi)
  - Community: 50
- Time zone: UTC+2 (EET)
  - Summer (DST): UTC+3 (EEST)

Figaleia (Greek: Φιγαλεία) is a mountain village and a former municipality in Elis, West Greece, Greece. Since the administrative reform of 2011 it is a municipal unit of the municipality of Zacharo. The municipal unit has an area of 89.175 km^{2}. In 2021 the population was 50 for the village and 1,250 for the municipal unit. The seat of the municipality was in Nea Figaleia. Figaleia is located south of Andritsaina, west of Megalopoli, north-northwest of Kalamata, northeast of Kyparissia and southeast of Pyrgos. Figaleia is located in mountainous southern Elis. The river Neda flows through the municipal unit. The name was taken from the ancient city-state of Phigaleia, which was located near the present village.

== Subdivisions ==
The municipal unit Figaleia is subdivided into the following communities (constituent villages in brackets):

- Figaleia
- Kryoneri (Kryoneri, Trianta)
- Nea Figaleia (Nea Figaleia, Faskomilia)
- Perivolia
- Petralona
- Stomio
