= Zacharo beach =

Beach in Greece

Coordinates: 37°28′N 21°37′E

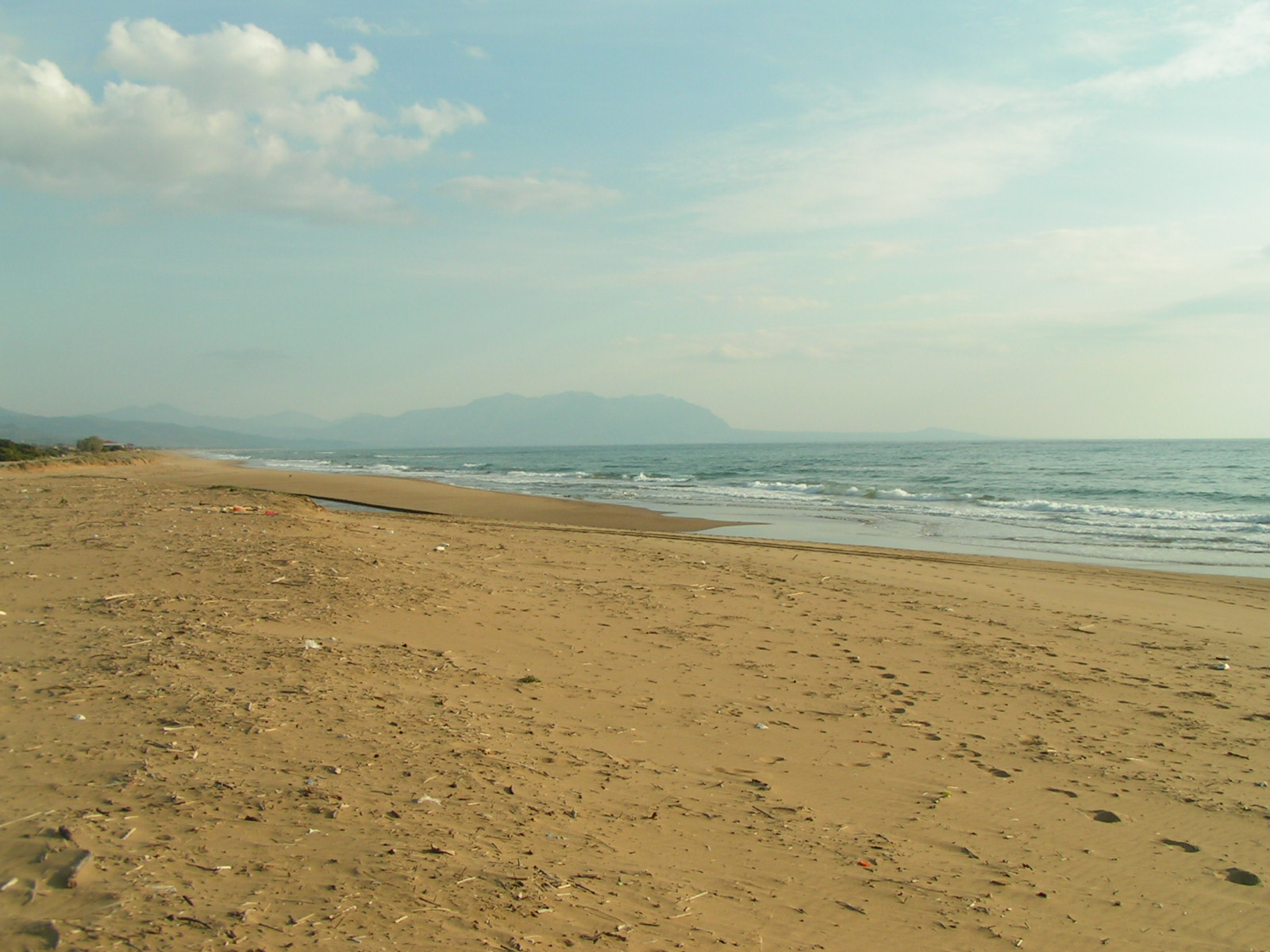
Zacharo beach in early spring

Zacharo beach (Greek: Παραλία Ζαχάρως), is the name of a beach that is located in the vicinity of Zacharo, in Southwestern Greece. It is situated on the Ionian Sea coast, in the area of the Gulf of Kyparissia. The beach features a soft, sandy terrain and is one of the lengthiest in Greece. It has been awarded the Blue flag prize for water quality and environmental management.

== Gallery ==
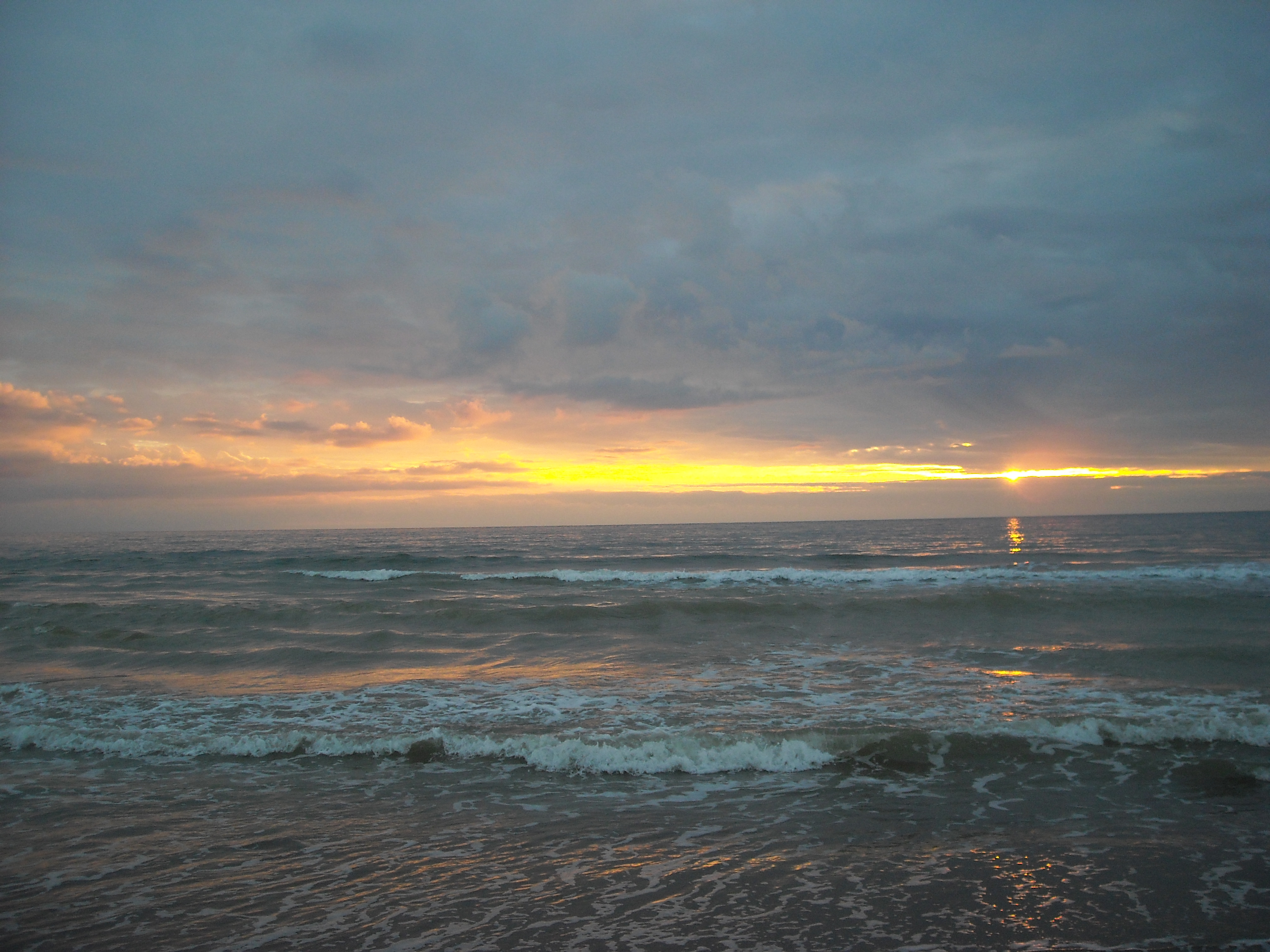
Sunset in Zacharo beach.

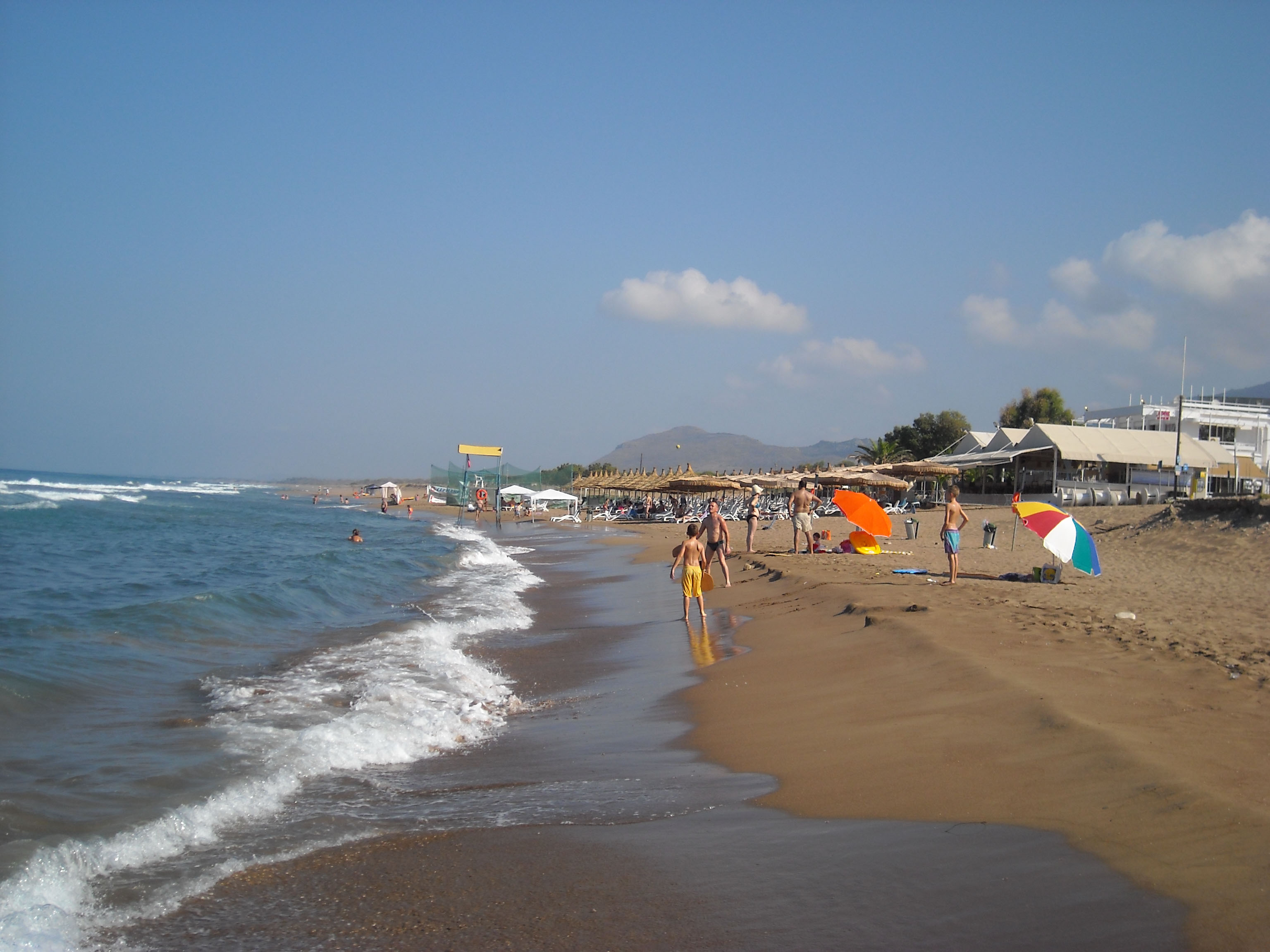
Zacharo beach and facilities in July 2010.
