= Nea Figaleia =

Nea Figaleia Νέα Φιγαλεία
- Community
- Location within Greece
- Coordinates: 37°25′N 21°46′E
- Country: Greece
- Administrative region: West Greece
- Regional unit: Elis
- Municipality: Zacharo
- Municipal unit: Figaleia
- Elevation: 451 m (1,480 ft)

Population (2021)
  - Community: 954
- Time zone: UTC+2 (EET)
  - Summer (DST): UTC+3 (EEST)
- Postal code: 27056
- Area code: +30 26250

Nea Figaleia (Greek: Νέα Φιγαλεία, before 1927: Zουρτσα - Zourtsa) is an historical town in Elis, that since the 2011 local government reform is a part of the municipality of Zacharo, Elis, Peloponnese, Greece. The town was the seat of the municipality of Figaleia until 2011 (Kallikratis Programme). Its average altitude is 451 meters above sea level. It has many churches, among which the predominantly old stone church St. Nicholas. The folklore museum and the community clinic are located along the main road. The main landscape is formed of olive trees and cypresses with a panoramic view towards the Ionian Sea.

== History ==
Zourtsa's settlement probably dates back to the 11th century A.D.. Important document for the Zourtsa's history is the golden seal of Mystras, signed in 1321 by Andronikos II Palaiologos. Zourtsa undertaking a significant role during the Independence War of 1821. It was mentioned by the Turkish traveler Evliya Çelebi who visited the area between 1668 and 1671. He described it as a famous resort, full of springs, vineyards, gardens and 150 stone-built houses. The town was renamed Kato Figalia in 1927, and Nea Figaleia in 1976.

== Population ==
Year	Town	Community
1951	1,925	2,082
1961	1,669	2,004
1971	1,645	1,965
1981	1,318	1,614
1991	1,329	1,689
2001	1,279	1,624
2011	785	1,033
2021	731	954

== See also ==
- List of settlements in Elis
