= Araklovon Castle =

Coordinates: 37.4875°N 21.7825°E

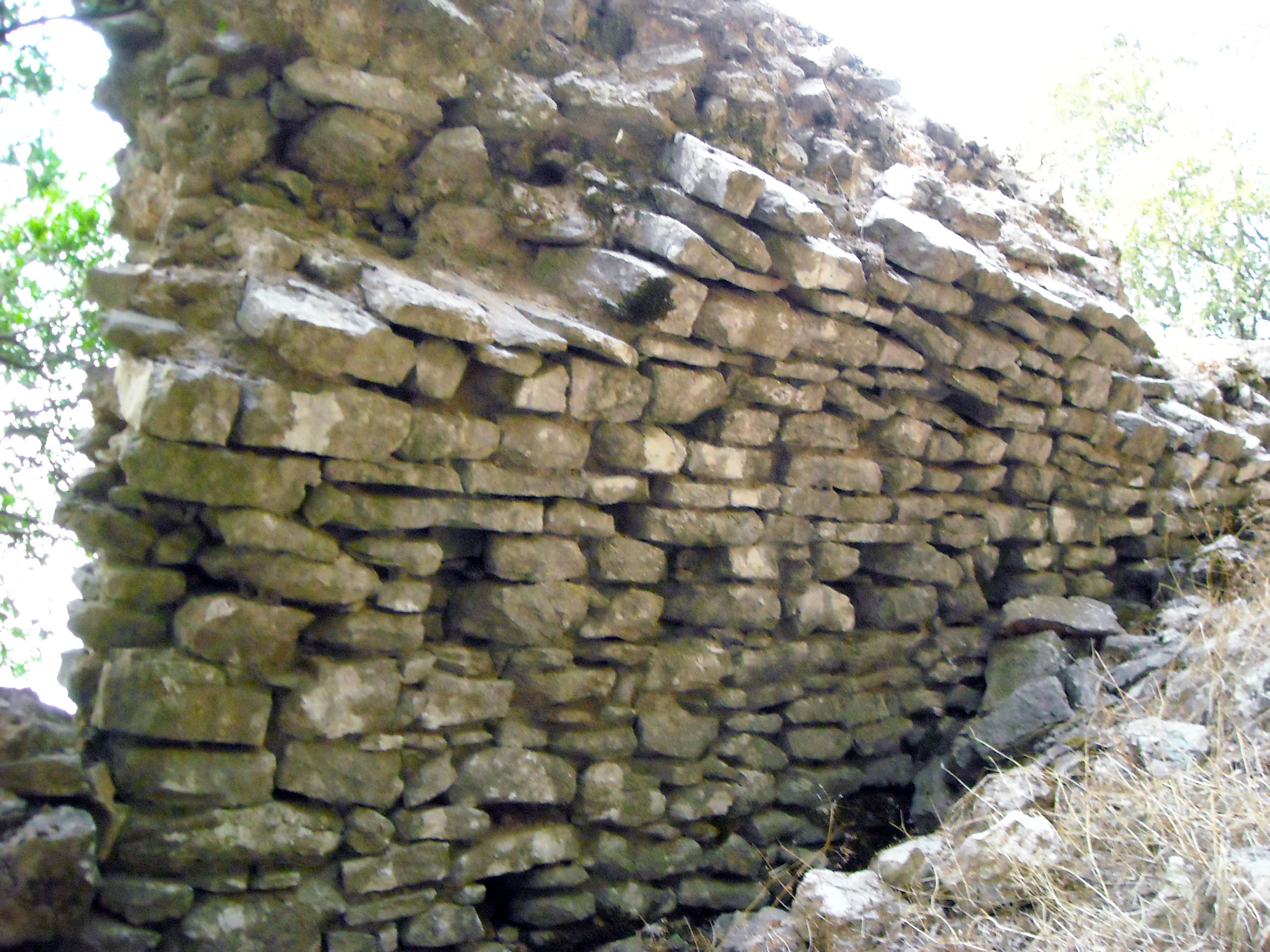
Part of the wall of one of the sites identified as the Araklovon castle, on Mount Minthi.

Araklovon (Greek: Ἀράκλοβον), rarely known with the variant Oreoklovon (Ὀρεόκλοβον) and in French as Bucelet and variants thereof, was a medieval castle of the Byzantine era located in the region of Skorta in the southwestern Peloponnese in Greece.

== History ==
The castle was built already in Byzantine times, and was of strategic importance as it lay at the mouth of the mountain pass (droungos) leading from the coastal plains of Elis to Skorta and the interior of the peninsula. The origin of the Greek name is unclear and has been much debated, including proposals that it means "mountain cage", or linking it with Herakles, although no sanctuary of his is known to have existed in the area. Similarly, the Western name in its various forms (Bucel[l]et, Bucello, Polcellecto, Porcelle, Bucel[l]etto) is of unclear origin.

At the time of the arrival of the Crusaders under William of Champlitte and Geoffrey of Villehardouin and the onset of their conquest of the Peloponnese in 1205, Araklovon was held by Doxapatres Boutsaras. The Crusaders tried to storm the castle, but failed. The Aragonese version of the Chronicle of the Morea then records that the Crusaders left part of their forces to lay a siege, or rather an on-and-off blockade, on the castle, which may have lasted as late as 1210. The castle is not mentioned thereafter until the revolt of the inhabitants of Skorta in 1264, and again in the late 1270s, when Geoffrey II of Briel, in an effort to claim some of the inheritance of his uncle, Geoffrey of Briel, seized the castle by a ruse. He then called upon the Byzantine Greeks of Mystras for aid, but they were stopped by the Frankish "Captain of Skorta", Simon of Vidoigne, and Geoffrey was forced to capitulate.

The castle thereafter followed the fortunes of the wider Barony of Karytaina, reverting to the princely domain in the early 14th century. In 1391, it is recorded that the settlement near the castle numbered 100 hearths. At the beginning of the Ottoman–Venetian War of 1463–1479, it was captured by the Venetians, but was recovered by the Ottomans in 1467.

== Location ==
From the 16th century on, the castle disappears from the sources and from local toponymy; as a result, various hypotheses were put forward by later scholars as to its location based on the indications in the medieval sources. Suggested identifications include the ruined castles at Palaiokastro, Platiana (now identified with medieval Acumba), Samiko on the coast, Chrysouli near Mount Minthi, and on the peak of Mount Smerna. The latter two locations are the most common to be identified as medieval Araklovon.

== Sources ==
- Bon, Antoine (1969). La Morée franque. Recherches historiques, topographiques et archéologiques sur la principauté d'Achaïe (in French). Paris: De Boccard.
