= Anigrides =

Greek mythology (nymphs)

The Anigrides (Ancient Greek: Ἀνίγριδες) or Anigriades (Ancient Greek: Ἀνιγριάδες) were in Greek mythology the nymphs of the river Anigrus in Elis. On the coast of Elis, not far from the mouth of the river, there was a grotto sacred to them near modern Samiko, which was visited by persons afflicted with skin diseases. They were supposedly cured here by prayers and sacrifices to the nymphs, and by bathing in the river. The earliest known attestation of the cult of these nymphs was from the poet Moero in the 3rd century BCE.

The river Anigrus (or Anigros) itself was a small stream in southern Elis that flowed down from Mount Lapithas and the mountains at Minthi to the Ionian Sea. The waters are distinctly sulfuric in character. The river and cave are now part of the thermal springs of Kaiafas.
