= Hugh of Champlitte =

Crusader

Hugh of Champlitte (died 1209) was the nephew of William of Champlitte, the first Prince of Achaea.

Hugh and his uncle traveled with the Fourth Crusade and were at the conquest of Constantinople in 1204. They arrived in the Peloponnesus in 1205. Hugh assisted his uncle in the conquest of Corinth and surrounding regions.

In 1208, William was recalled to Burgundy by news of the death of his elder brother, in order to claim the inheritance. His sons being underage, he left his Greek conquests to Hugh as bailiff or viceroy. Hugh did not long survive, while William died in Apulia on the way to France. Hugh was succeeded in Achaea (Morea) by Geoffrey I of Villehardouin.

== Sources ==
- Finley Jr, John H. "Corinth in the Middle Ages." Speculum, Vol. 7, No. 4. (Oct., 1932), pp. 477–499.
- Tozer, H. F. "The Franks in the Peloponnese." The Journal of Hellenic Studies, Vol. 4. (1883), pp. 165–236.
