= Sami (ancient city) =

Coordinates: 37°32′00″N 21°35′52″E

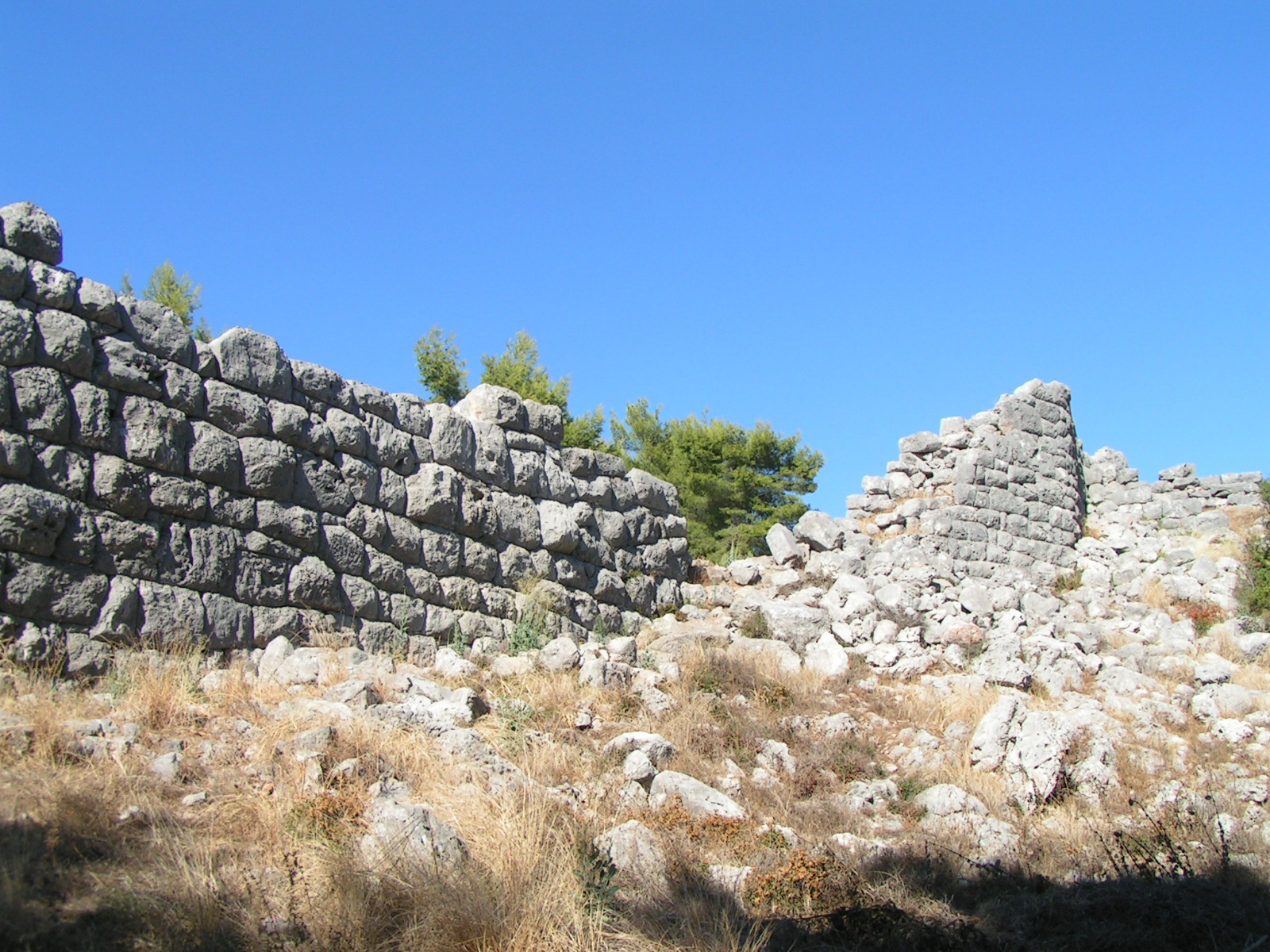
Part of the wall that protects the citadel of Ancient Sami.

Sami (Greek: Σάμη), also referred to as Samia (Greek: Σαμία), Arini (Greek: Αρήνη), or Makistos (Greek: Μάκιστος) was a city in Ancient Greece. It was located in the Elis region, in western Peloponnese. The archaeological site consists of the remains of Sami's fortified citadel, which dates to the Archaic period. It is situated on the slopes of the Lapithas mountain and faces the coast of the Ionian Sea and also the plain of the Kato Samiko area.

== Nearest places ==
- Ancient Olympia
- Zacharo
