= Artemida =

Artemida may refer to:

- Artemis, a goddess in Greek mythology
- Artemida, Attica, a town in Attica, Greece
- Artemida, Elis, a village in Elis, Greece
- Artemida, Magnesia, a municipality in Magnesia, Greece
