= Doxapatres Boutsaras =

13th century Greek lord

Doxapatres Boutsaras (Greek: Δοξαπατρής Βουτσαράς) was a Byzantine Greek independent lord in the central Peloponnese in the early 13th century. He had his headquarters in the Araklovon Castle, which is located near the Minthi village, in the Municipality of Zacharo. He withstood the attacks of the Franks of the Fourth Crusade for several years, until it finally fell ca. 1210 and became part of the Principality of Achaea.

His heroic defense of the fort is recorded in the Chronicle of the Morea, especially its Latin versions, where he assumes superhuman proportions: he is said to have held a mace that no other man could lift, and that his cuirass alone weighed 150 pounds. Stories are also told of his daughter, Maria Doxapatre, who allegedly threw herself from the castle walls rather than become the mistress of William of Champlitte.

Doxapatres is a family name.

== See also ==
- Frankokratia
