= Giannitsochori =

Giannitsochori Γιαννιτσοχώρι
- Community
- Location within Greece
- Coordinates: 37°23.5′N 21°41.4′E
- Country: Greece
- Administrative region: West Greece
- Regional unit: Elis
- Municipality: Zacharo
- Municipal unit: Zacharo
- Elevation: 15 m (49 ft)

Population (2021)
  - Community: 503
- Time zone: UTC+2 (EET)
  - Summer (DST): UTC+3 (EEST)
- Postal code: 270 54
- Area code: 26250

Giannitsochori (Greek: Γιαννιτσοχώρι) is a village in the municipality of Zacharo, southern Elis, Greece. It is situated in the narrow coastal plains along the Ionian Sea, 2 km north of the mouth of the river Neda, at the foot of the western extensions of the mountain Minthi. It is a known beach resort. It is 2 km north of Elaia, 5 km southeast of Neochori and 11 km southeast of Zacharo. The Greek National Road 9/E55 (Pyrgos - Kyparissia) and the railway from Pyrgos to Kalamata pass through the village.

== Historical population ==
Year	Population
1981	479
1991	481
2001	517
2011	445
2021	503

== See also ==
- List of settlements in Elis
