= Kakovatos =

Village in Elis, Greece

Kakovatos Κακόβατος
- Community
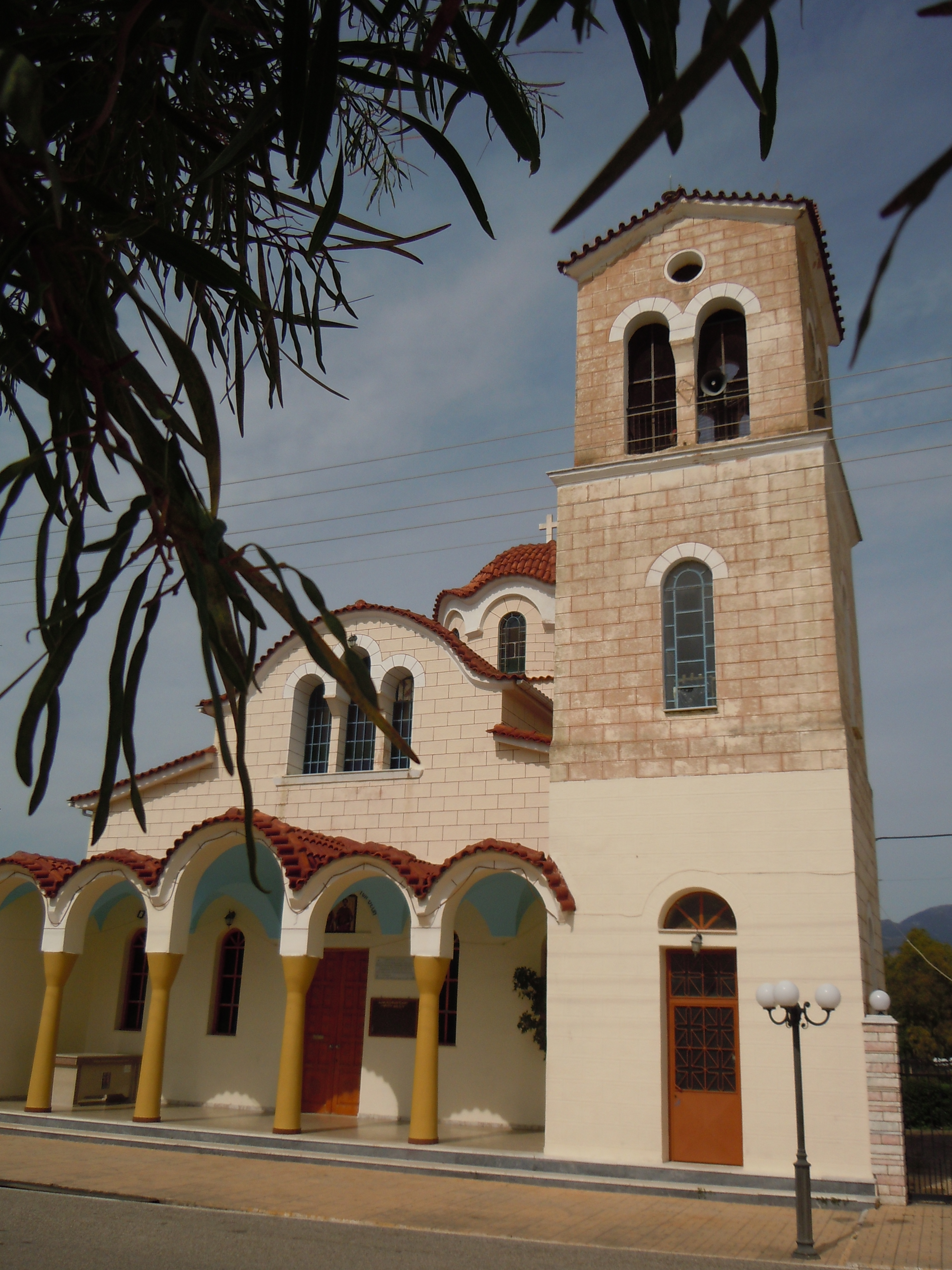
- Church of Kakovatos

- Location within Greece
- Coordinates: 37°27′N 21°39′E
- Country: Greece
- Administrative region: Western Greece
- Regional unit: Elis
- Municipality: Zacharo
- Municipal unit: Zacharo

Population (2021)
  - Community: 399
- Time zone: UTC+2 (EET)
  - Summer (DST): UTC+3 (EEST)

Kakovatos (Greek: Κακόβατος) is a seaside village in Elis, Greece. It is located in the western Peloponnese, approximately in the center of the Gulf of Kyparissia, on the coast of the Ionian Sea. Administratively, it is a part of the municipality of Zacharo.

Located 3 km southwest of Zacharo, it is surrounded by the villages of Schini, Kalidona, Anilio and Neochori. The beach of Kakovatos, and the Gulf of Kyparissia in general, is a spawning area of the Loggerhead sea turtle.
