= Dimitrios Pitsinis =

Dimitrios Pitsinis (Kyparissia, 18 February 1925 – Athens, 3 September 2003) was a Greek surgeon, university teacher and health industry promoter.

== Early life ==
He was born in the small town of Kyparissia in the west of the Peloponnese in Greece in a family of 7 brothers and sisters. He lost his mother at a very early stage and grew up under the care of his two elder sisters. He finished high school in Kyparissia and he then was successfully admitted in the medical school of the University of Athens.

== Professional life ==
Although he was stopped from medical school for 3 years in order to be listed in the army for the Greek Civil War he managed to graduate with honour. He went on and trained as surgeon in the 1st department of surgery (Ipokration Hospital). Following a career as an academic surgeon in the University of Athens medical school he became a founding member and co-owner of a prototype private hospital in Athens, Greece under the name Apolonio Therapeftirio where he practiced general surgery for many years. He retired at the age of 75.

== Personal life ==
He was married to Eleni Parasxou late in his life at the age of 50 and had with her one son named Vassilis who also became a surgeon.
