= Konstantinos Lambrinopoulos =

Konstantinos Lambrinopoulos Κωνσταντίνος Λαμπρινόπουλος
- Born: 1893; Kyparissia, Greece
- Died: 1965; Athens, Greece
- Occupation: judge

Konstantinos Lambrinopoulos or Lamprinopoulos (Greek: Κωνσταντίνος Λαμπρινόπουλος, 1893-1965) was a Greek judge, politician and Mayor of Patras from 18 August 1950 until 12 February 1951.

He was born in 1893 in Kyparissia in the northwestern Messenia Prefecture. He studied law in the University of Athens and lived originally in Patras, before returning to work as a judge in Kyparissia. He later continued as chairman of the court of first instance in Sparti until he was transferred to Patras to fill the vacant post of Mayor of Patras, according to the then-current law. He was forced to resign soon after, however, in order to be appointed councillor for life of the Court of Audit in Athens. He later assumed a seat in the Areopagus, until his retirement in 1963.

He was married and had four children. He died in Athens in 1965.
