= Kaiafas Lake =

Lake in Elis, Greece

- Λίμνη Καϊάφα (Greek)
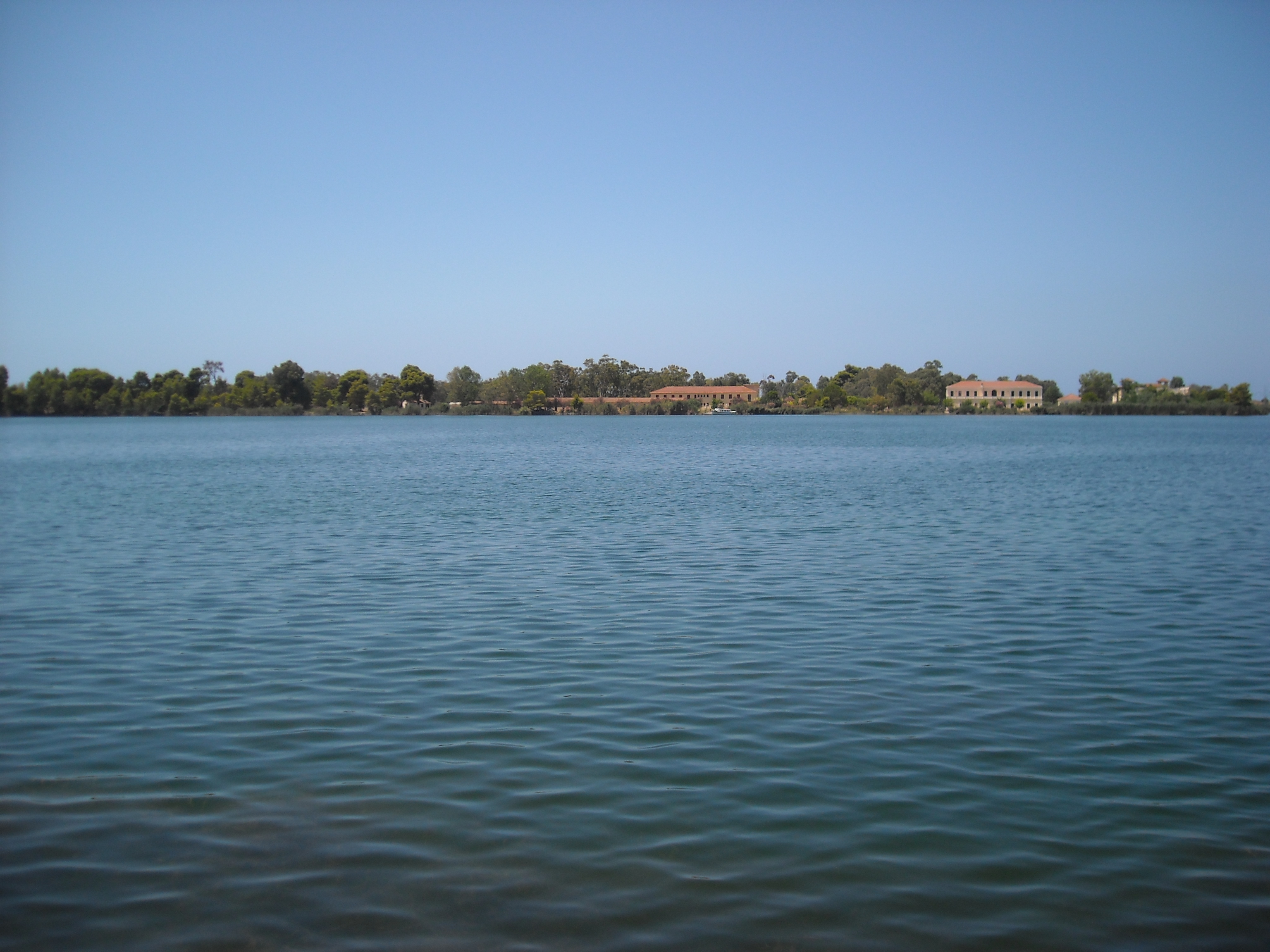

- Location within Greece
- Location: Elis, Greece
- Coordinates: 37°30′29.62″N 21°36′27.73″E

Kaiafas lake (Greek: Λίμνη Καϊάφα) is a lake in Elis in southwestern Greece, extending north of the town of Zacharo. It was likely formed after an earthquake struck the river Anigros. It lies between the Lapithas Mountains and the Ionian Sea.

The lake is home to an algae species, Chara corfuensis.

== See also ==
- Anigrides
