= Anilio, Elis =

Anilio
- Community
- Location within Greece
- Coordinates: 37°27′18″N 21°41′06″E
- Country: Greece
- Administrative region: West Greece
- Regional unit: Elis
- Municipality: Zacharo
- Municipal unit: Zacharo

Population (2021)
  - Community: 175
- Time zone: UTC+2 (EET)
  - Summer (DST): UTC+3 (EEST)

Anilio (Greek: Ανήλιο, meaning without sun) is a settlement in Zacharo municipality in western Elis, Peloponnese, Greece.

== See also ==
- List of settlements in Elis
