= Doxapatres =

Byzantine family name

Doxapatres (Greek: Δοξαπατρη̑ς, anglicized Doxapater) is Byzantine family name. The forms Δοξόπατρος, Doxopatros, Doxopatres and Doxopater are erroneous.

Persons with this name include;

- Gregory Doxapatres (11th century), commentator on the Basilika
- John Doxapatres (11th century), rhetorician and commentator
- Nicholas Doxapatres (12th century), canonist, possibly identical with Neilos
- Neilos Doxapatres (12th century), Siculo-Greek monk and writer, possibly identical with Nicholas
- Doxapatres Boutsaras (13th century)
