= Menthe =

Menthe may be,

- Minthe, a naiad
- Menthe people
- Menthe language

== See also ==
- Minthe (disambiguation)
