= Agios Ilias, Zacharo =

Agios Ilias
- Community
- Location within Greece
- Coordinates: 37°24′43″N 21°41′28″E
- Country: Greece
- Geographic region: Peloponnese
- Administrative region: Western Greece
- Regional unit: Elis
- Municipality: Zacharo
- Municipal unit: Zacharo
- Elevation: 260 m (850 ft)

Population (2021)
  - Community: 51
- Time zone: UTC+2 (EET)
  - Summer (DST): UTC+3 (EEST)
- Postal code: 27054
- Area code: +30-26250

Agios Ilias is a settlement in the municipality of Zacharo in southern Elis, Peloponnese, Greece. It was an independent community from 1912 until 1997. It is situated 2 km from the coast, and 9 km southeast of Zacharo.

== See also ==
- List of settlements in Elis
