= Neda (river) =

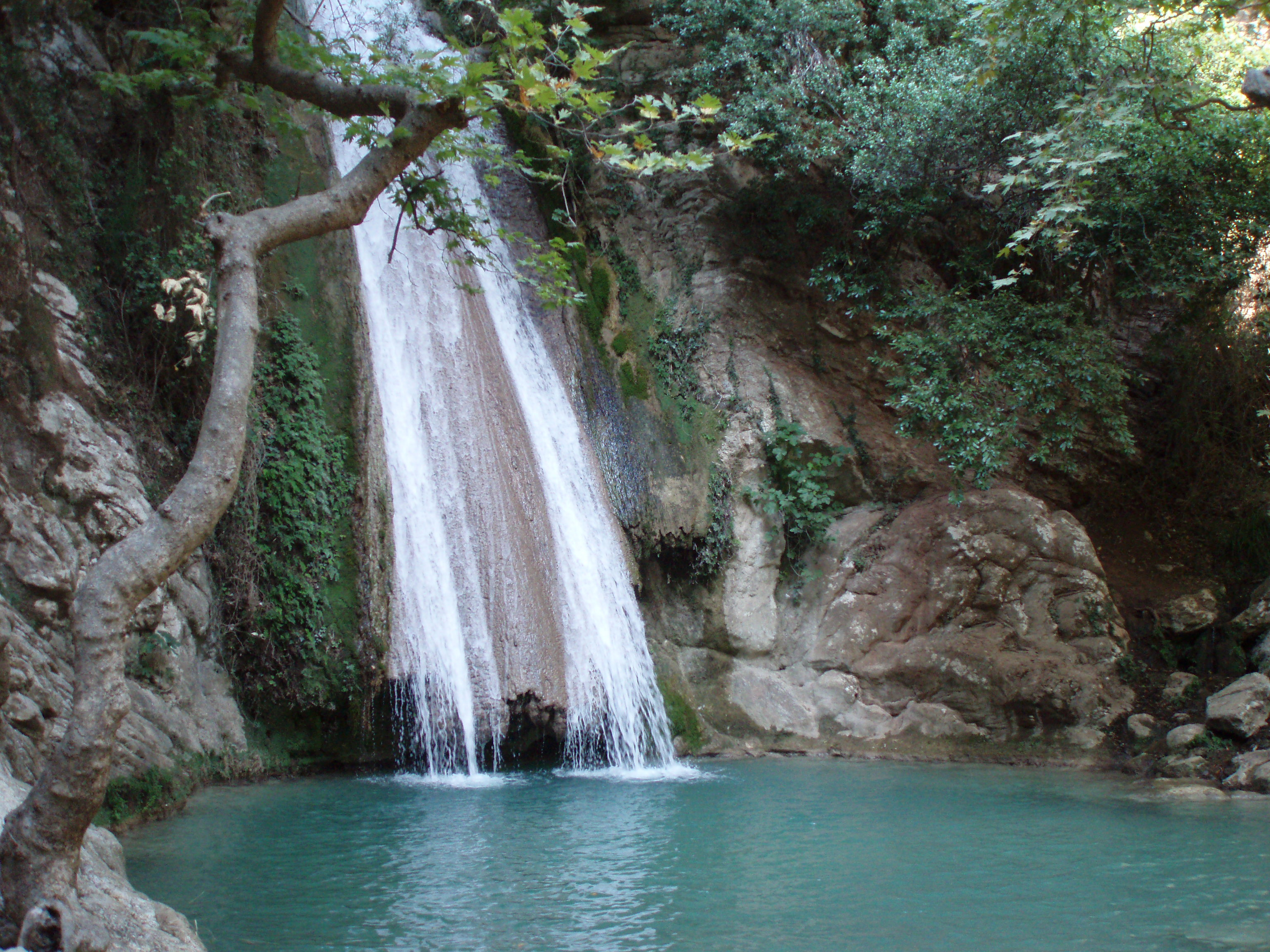
- Neda waterfalls
- Native name: Νέδα (Greek)

Location
- Country: Greece

Physical characteristics
- Source
  - location: Mount Lykaion
- Mouth
  - location: Ionian Sea
  - coordinates: 37°22′30″N 21°40′58″E
- Length: 31 km (19 mi)
- Basin size: 278 km^{2} (107 sq mi)

The Neda (Greek: Νέδα) is a river in the western Peloponnese in Greece. It is 31 km (19 mi) long, and its drainage area is 278 km^{2} (107 sq mi). It is unique in the sense that it is the only river in Greece with a feminine name.

It took its name from the nymph Neda.

== Geography ==
The river begins on the southern slope of Mount Lykaion, near the village of Neda in northern Messenia. It flows to the west through a varied landscape of barren rock and forests. From near Figaleia until its mouth it forms the border of Messenia and Elis. There is a well known waterfall near the village Platania. The Neda flows into the Gulf of Kyparissia, a bay of the Ionian Sea, near the village Giannitsochori.

== Places along the river ==
The Neda flows along the villages Neda, Kakaletri, Figaleia, Platania, Karyes and Giannitsochori.

== See also ==
- List of rivers in Greece
