= Terpsithea, Messenia =

Coordinates: 37°13′36″N 21°38′02″E

Terpsithea (Greek: Τερψιθέα) is a village in Messenia, southern Greece. It is a settlement of the town Kyparissia with 104 residents (2021 census). The village is about 500 metres from the Ionian Sea coast, 4 km southwest of Kyparissia. Greek National Road 9 passes through the village. The area is known for the production of watermelons.
