= Artemida, Elis =

Artemida Αρτέμιδα
- Community
- Location within Greece
- Coordinates: 37°32′N 21°42′E
- Country: Greece
- Administrative region: Western Greece
- Regional unit: Elis
- Municipality: Zacharo
- Municipal unit: Zacharo

Population (2021)
  - Community: 84
- Time zone: UTC+2 (EET)
  - Summer (DST): UTC+3 (EEST)

Artemida (Greek: Αρτέμιδα; before 1948: Κουμουθέκρας - Koumouthekras) is a village near Zacharo in southern Elis in the western part of the Peloponnese peninsula of Greece. The village was completely destroyed in the 2007 Greek forest fires. Twenty-three residents of Artemida lost their lives.

On August 30, 2007, the Government of Cyprus announced that it will reconstruct the village.
