= Stasio, Greece =

Stasio Στασιό
- Community
- Location within Greece
- Coordinates: 37°13′05″N 21°40′12″E
- Country: Greece
- Administrative region: Peloponnese
- Regional unit: Messenia
- Municipality: Trifylia
- Municipal unit: Kyparissia

Population (2021)
  - Community: 73
- Time zone: UTC+2 (EET)
  - Summer (DST): UTC+3 (EEST)

Stasio (Greek: Στασιό) is a village in the municipal unit of Kyparissia, Greece. In 2021 its population was 73. It is 4 km south of Kyparissia. The church in the village is St. Michael's and Gabriel's.
