= Stasio (surname) =

Stasio or di Stasio is a surname. Notable people with the surname include:

- Frank Stasio, American talk radio host
- Iolanda Di Stasio (born 1992), Italian politician
- Justina di Stasio (born 1992), Canadian wrestler
- Marilyn Stasio, American author, writer, and literary critic
- Ralph di Stasio (born 1981), stage name Avery Storm, singer
