= Zacharo =

Town in Elis, Greece

Zacharo Ζαχάρω
- Municipality
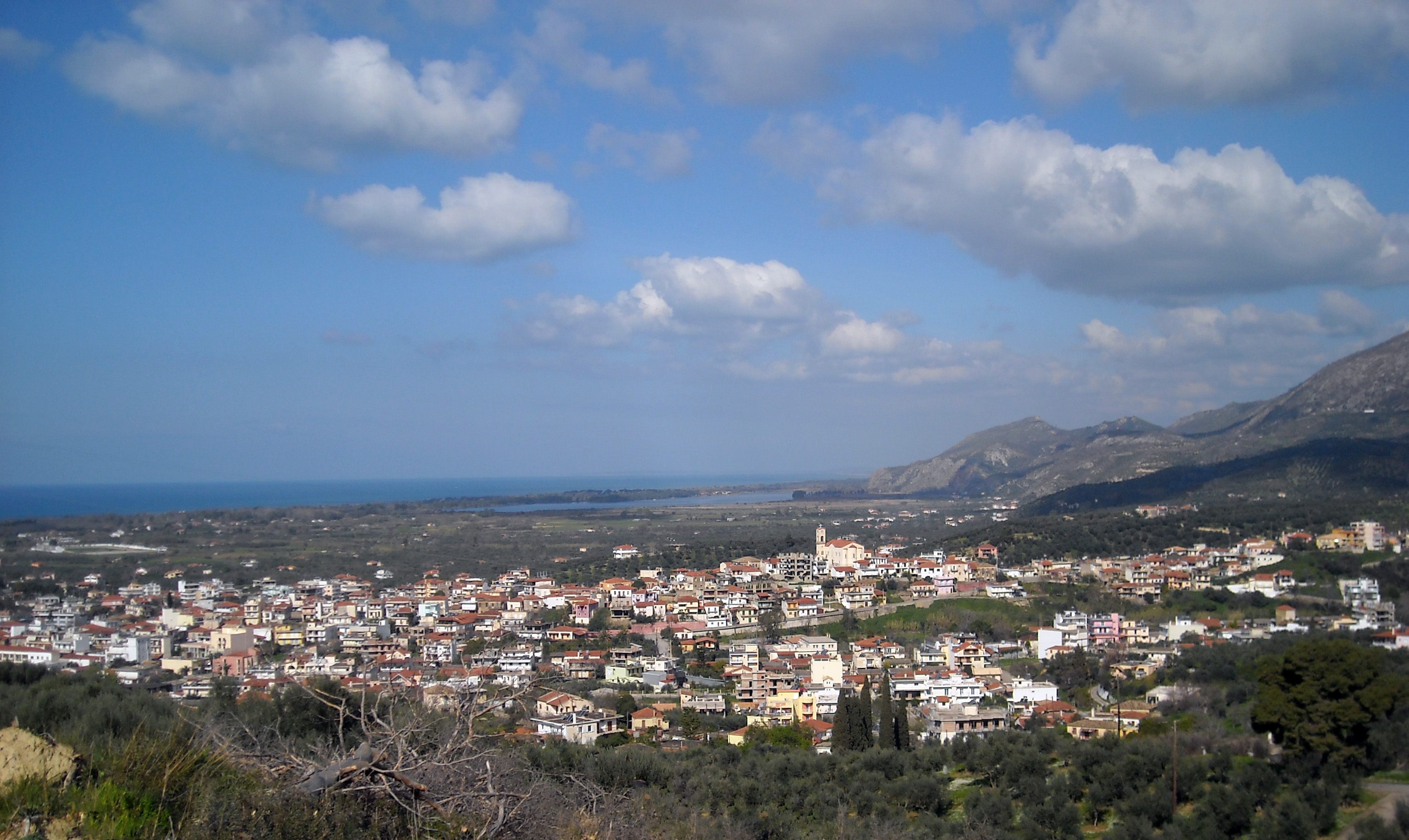

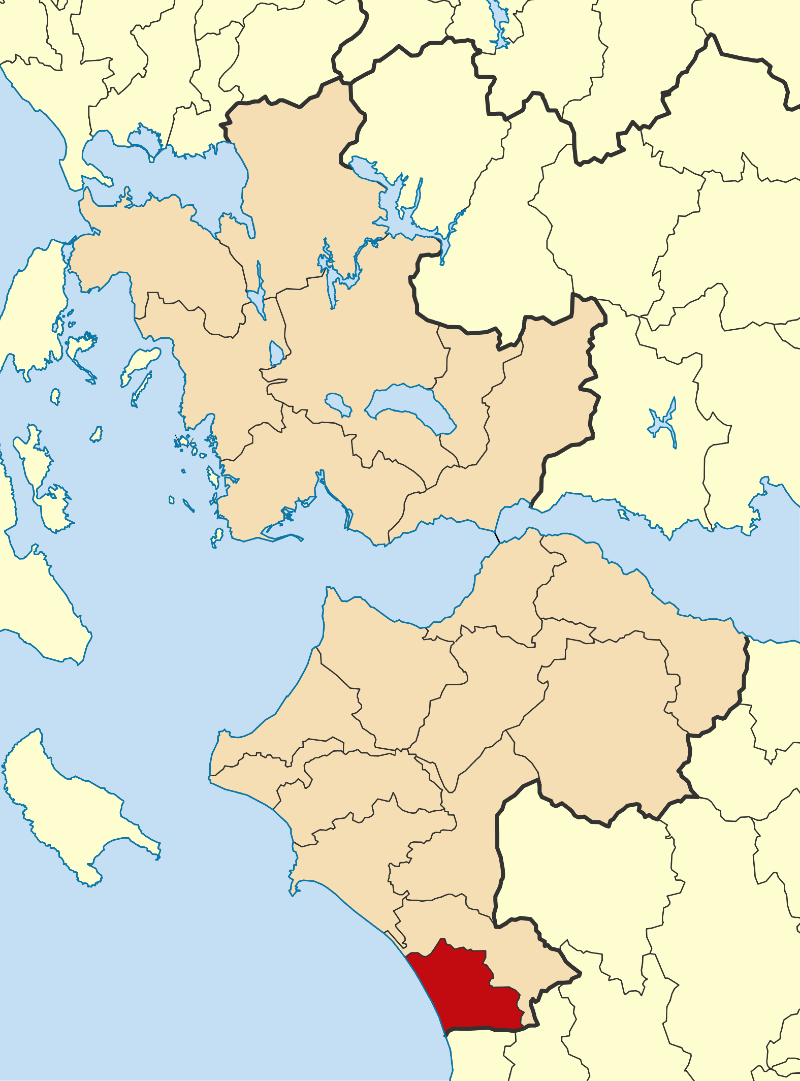

- Location within Greece
- Coordinates: 37°29′N 21°39′E
- Country: Greece
- Geographic region: Peloponnese
- Administrative region: West Greece
- Regional unit: Elis

Government
  - Mayor: Konstantinos Mitropoulos (since 2023)

Area
  - Municipality: 276.2 km^{2} (106.6 sq mi)
  - Municipal unit: 187.0 km^{2} (72.2 sq mi)
- Elevation: 33 m (108 ft)
- Highest elevation: 1,345 m (4,413 ft)
- Lowest elevation: 0 m (0 ft)

Population (2021)
  - Municipality: 8,654
  - Density: 31.33/km^{2} (81.15/sq mi)
  - Municipal unit: 7,404
  - Municipal unit density: 39.59/km^{2} (102.5/sq mi)
  - Community: 3,172
- Time zone: UTC+2 (EET)
  - Summer (DST): UTC+3 (EEST)
- Postal code: 270 54
- Area code: 26250
- Vehicle registration: ΗΑ
- Website: www.zacharo.gr

Zacharo (Greek: Ζαχάρω) is a town and municipality in western Peloponnese, Greece. Administratively, it belongs to the regional unit of Elis in West Greece. Zacharo is situated on the coast of the Gulf of Kyparissia, a part of the Ionian Sea. The mountain Lapithas is to the north, and the Minthi is to the east. Northwest of the town, between mount Lapithas and the sea, is the Kaiafas Lake. Zacharo is 18 km south of Olympia, 28 km southeast of Pyrgos, 65 km northwest of Kalamata and 65 km west of Tripoli. The town is crossed by the Greek National Road 9/E55, that links Patras with Kalamata.

== Municipality ==
The municipality Zacharo was formed at the 2011 local government reform by the merger of the following 2 former municipalities, that became municipal units:

- Figaleia
- Zacharo

The municipality has an area of 276.222 km^{2}, the municipal unit 187.047 km^{2}.

=== Subdivisions ===
The municipal unit of Zacharo is divided into the following communities:

- Zacharo
- Agios Ilias
- Anilio
- Arini
- Artemida
- Chrysochori
- Giannitsochori
- Kakovatos
- Kalidona
- Lepreo
- Makistos
- Milea
- Minthi
- Neochori
- Prasidaki
- Rodina
- Smerna
- Schinoi
- Taxiarches
- Xirochori

== Zacharo town ==
Zacharo municipality map.

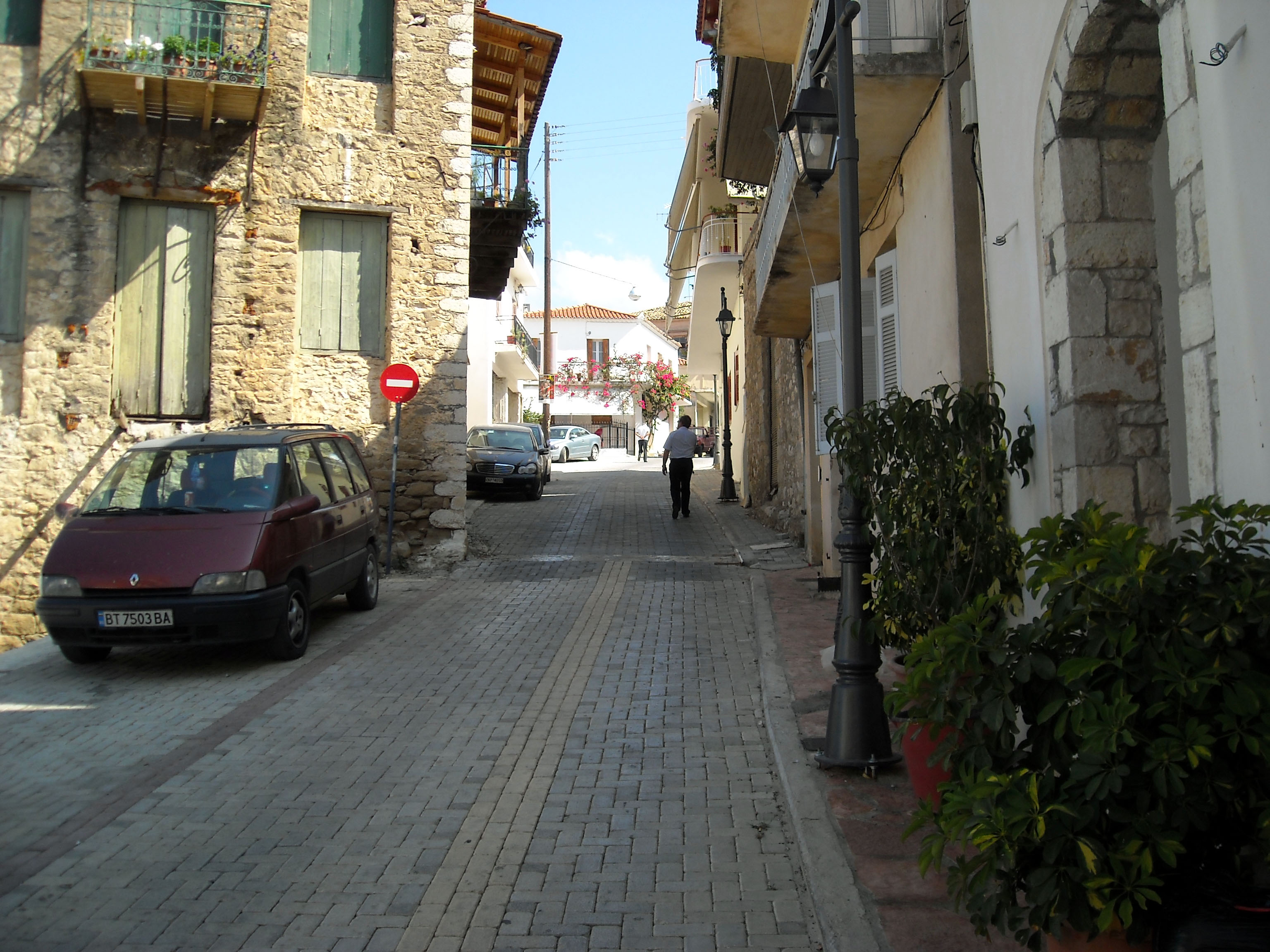
An old street of Zacharo.

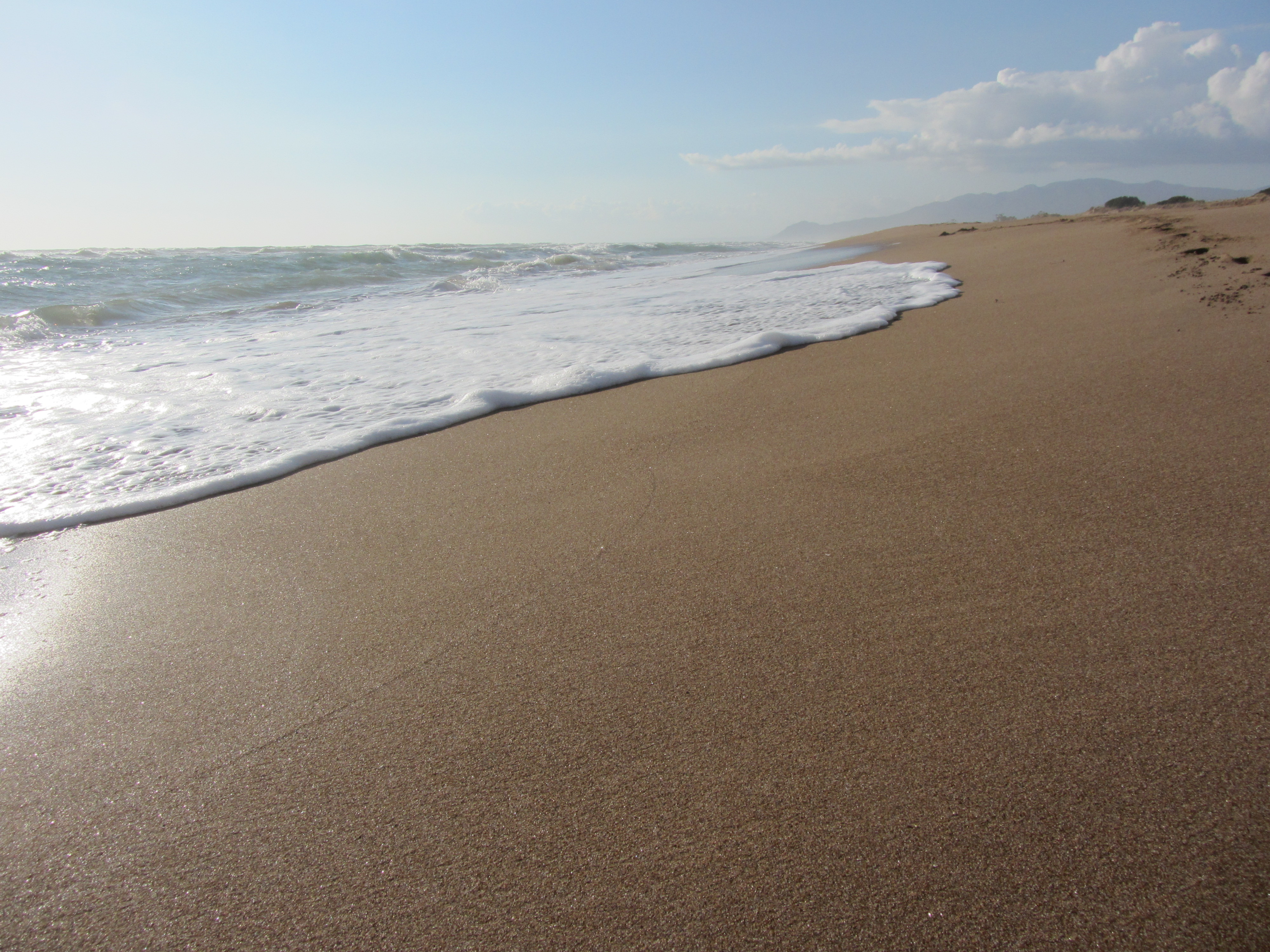
The beach of Zacharo is one of the longest in Greece.

Zacharo has a school, a kindergarten, a lyceum, a gymnasium, churches, a post office, a police station, a court, a health center, banks and a railway station. Athletic facilities include a football stadium, a basketball court and a community gym which is open to the public free of charge. The town is also the home of a football team, Olympiakos Zacharos, established in 1928. In the town center, there is a square with Platanus trees. The Patron saint of Zacharo is Saint Spyridon, and the central church of the city bears his name. The Saint's feast day is on December 12 and it is a holiday for the town.

== Population ==
Year	Town	Municipal unit	Municipality
1981	2,812	-	-
1991	4,318	11,041	-
2001	6,739	12,910	-
2011	3,145	7,582	8,953
2021	3,172	7,404	8,654

== History ==
The history of Zacharo begins in the middle of the 19th century. At the time of the Greek War of Independence, the area of Zacharo was sparsely populated. However, in the decades that followed, populations from the villages of the surrounding mountains started to migrate to the area. The town allegedly took its name from an inn, that belonged to a woman named Zacharoula. In 1881 Zacharo was officially proclaimed a community. In late August 2007, forest fires caused over 40 deaths, as well as extensive property damage. Zacharo was one of the worst-hit areas in Greece.

== Economy ==
The economy of Zacharo relies on tourism as well as on agriculture. The pleasant Mediterranean climate, long Zacharo beach, the Kaiafas Lake, the Thermal Springs of Kaiafas and the adjacent Lapithas mountain draw many tourists, especially in summer. The agricultural sector is also a major source of income for the local economy. It is based on the cultivation of olive trees, for the production of olive oil. The variety of olive tree which prevails in the area is the Koroneiki, which is one of the most distinguished in Greece. The olive oil produced is of extra-virgin quality and is mostly exported to the international market. The Zacharo tomato is famed for its sweetness. When ripe, it is loaded with sugars (mainly fructose and inulin) to the extent that the sugar crystals are visible to the naked eye. Cultivation of the Zacharo tomato is all but extinct, as the cultivar does not grow well in greenhouses, has a short season, and its extreme fleshiness makes the fruit heavy and liable to squeezing and decay when packed.

== People ==
- Doxapatres Boutsaras, 13th century Byzantine ruler

== Gallery ==
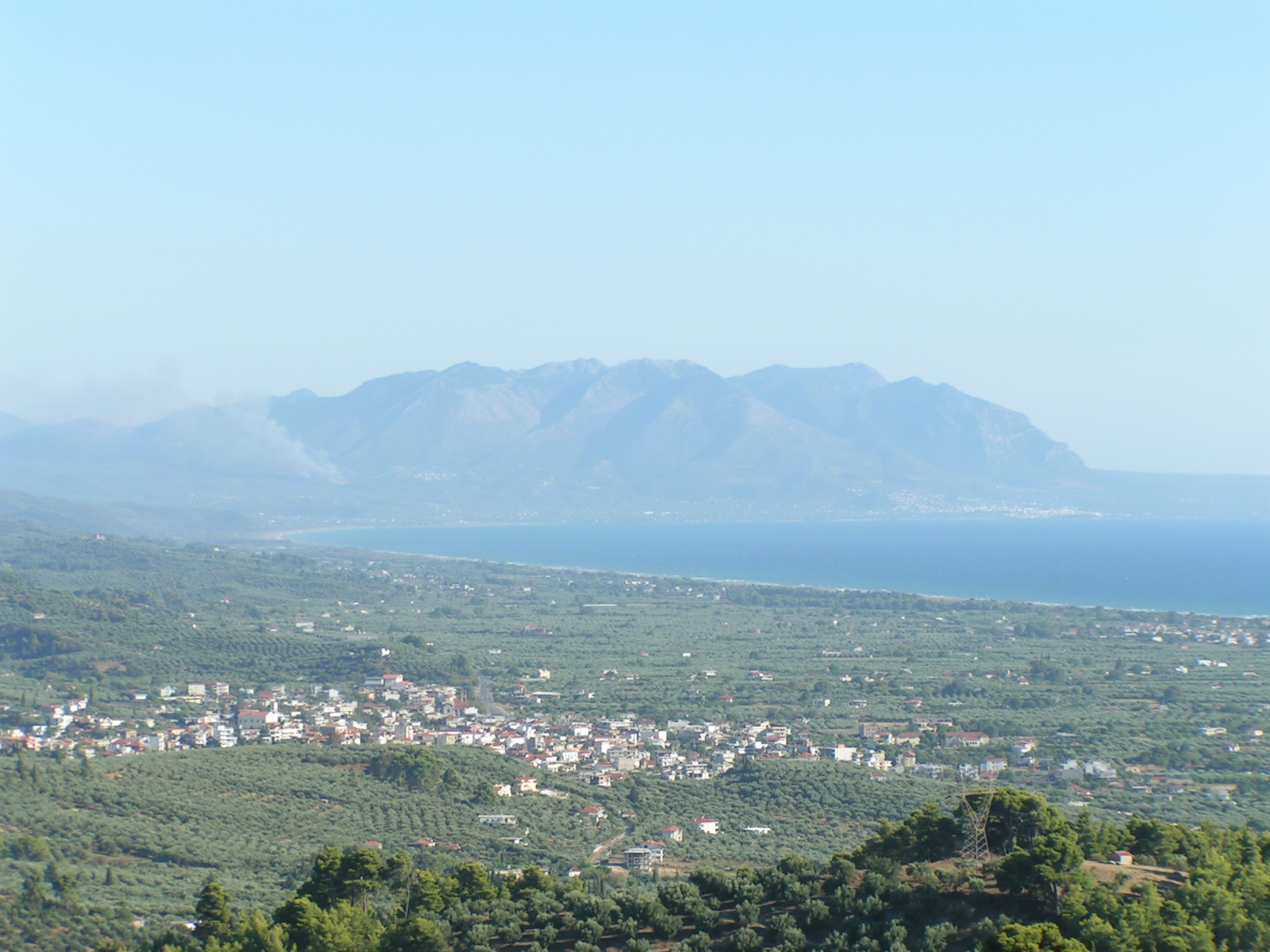
View of Zacharo from Lapithas mountain.

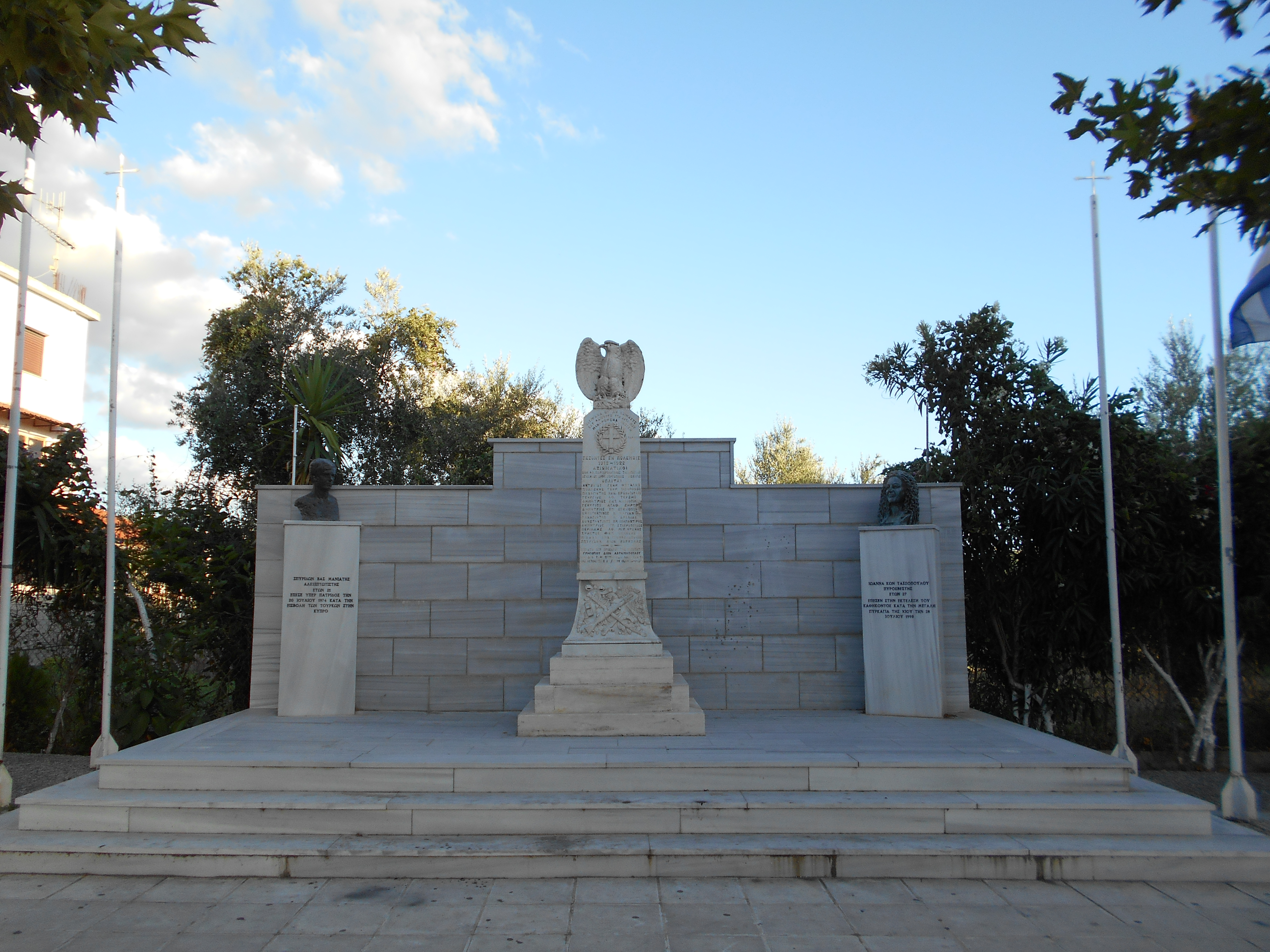
A monument.

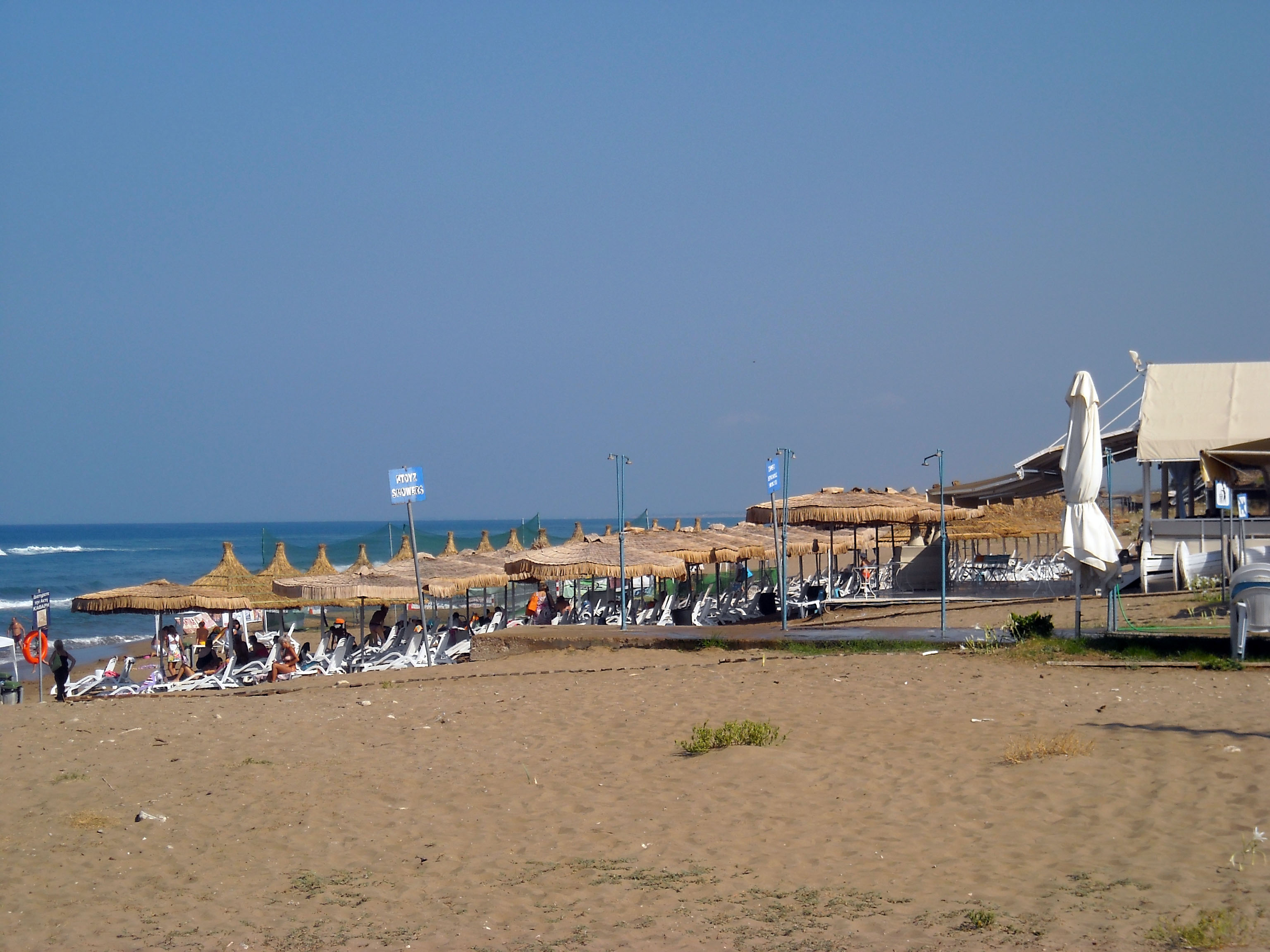
Zacharo's beach.

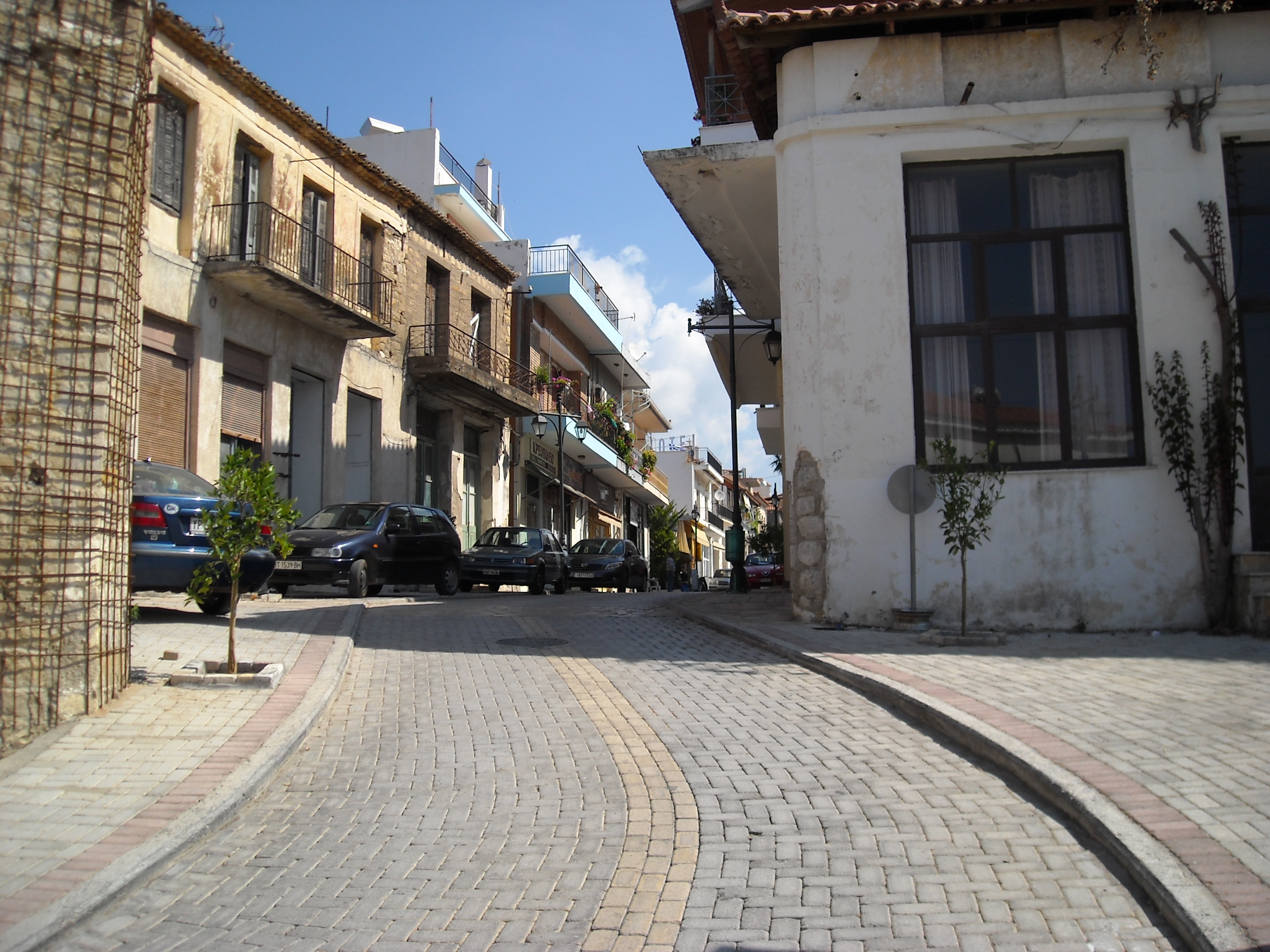
View of the old town.

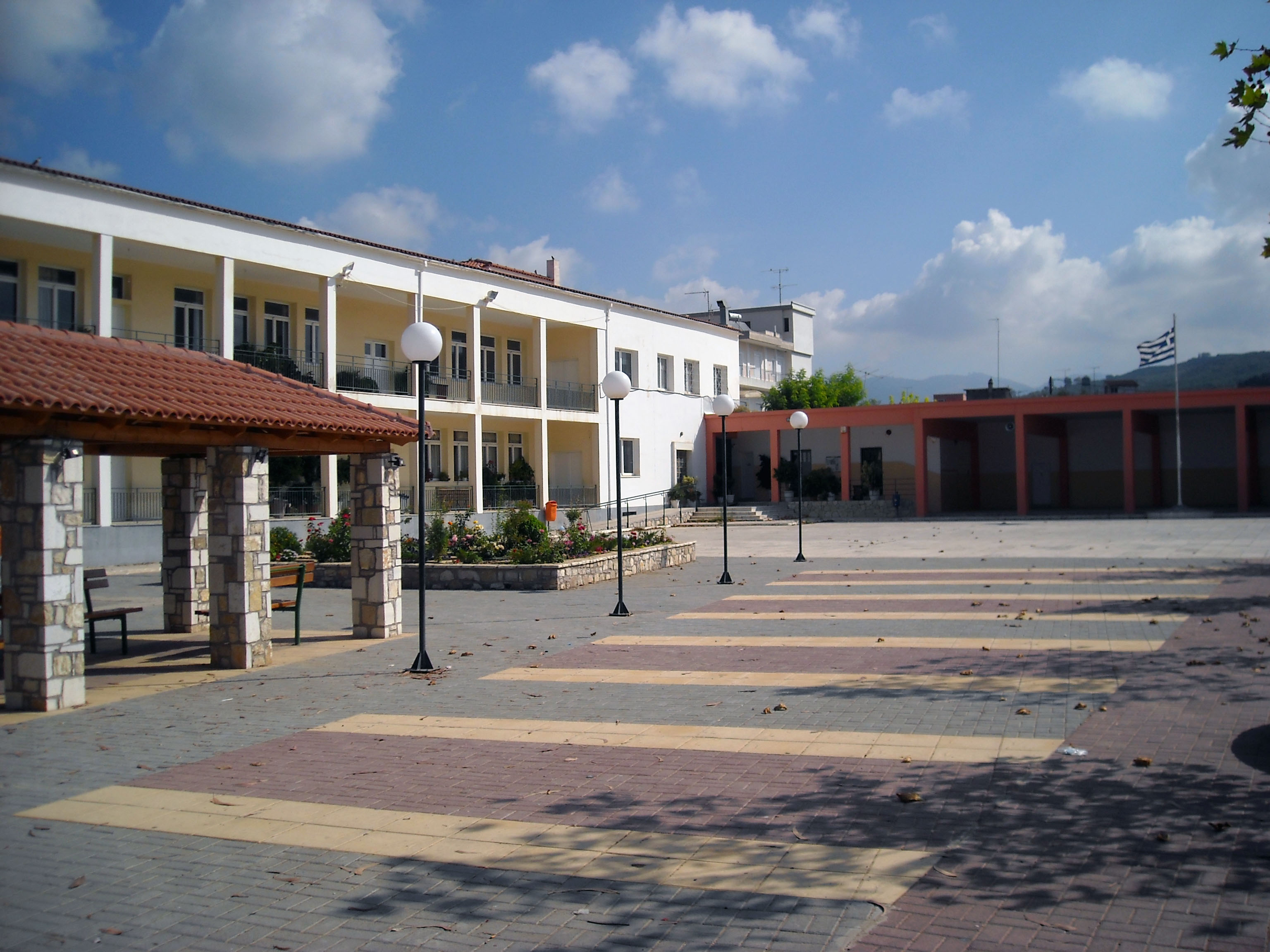
Zacharo's school.

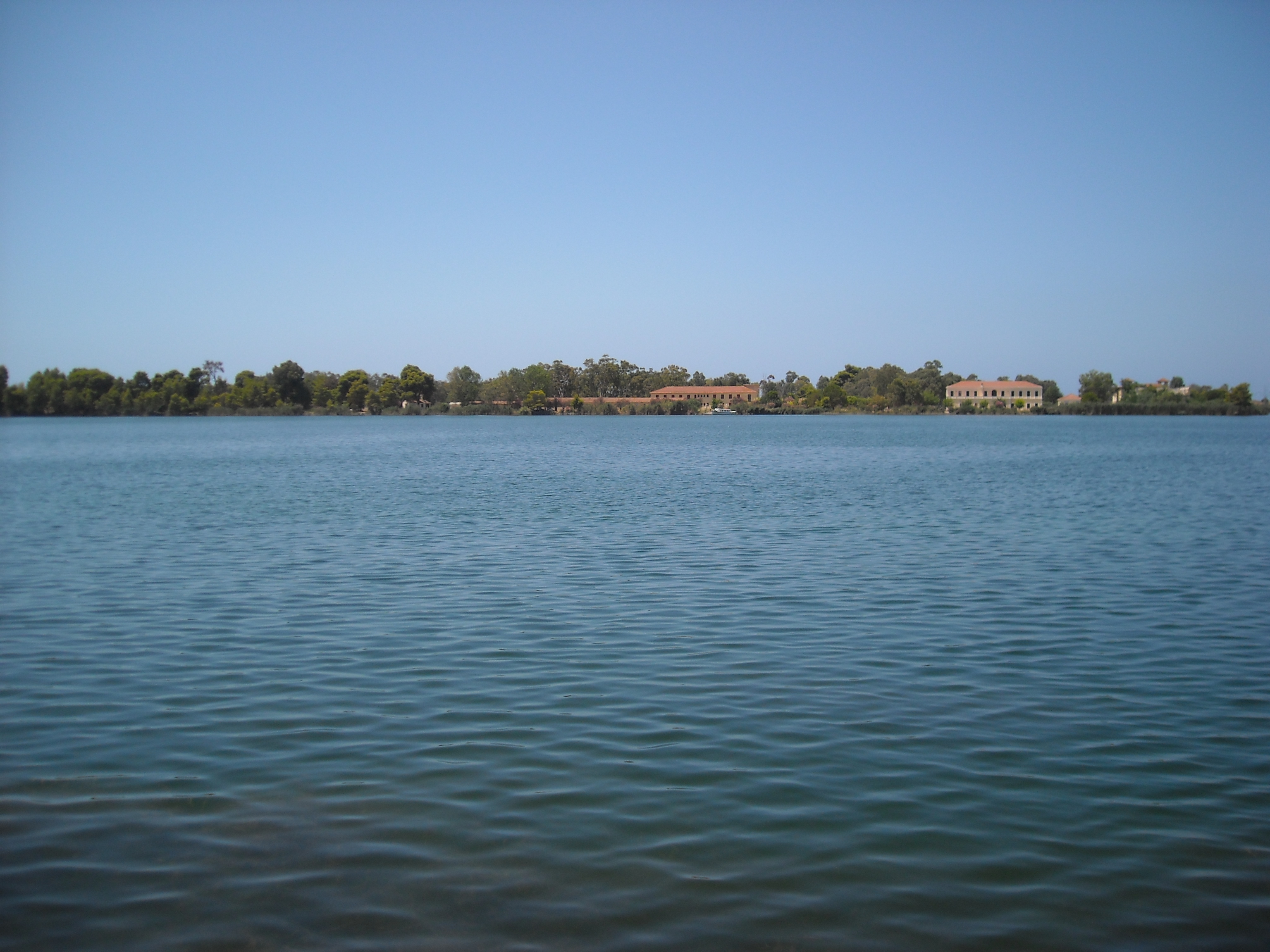
Kaiafas lake.

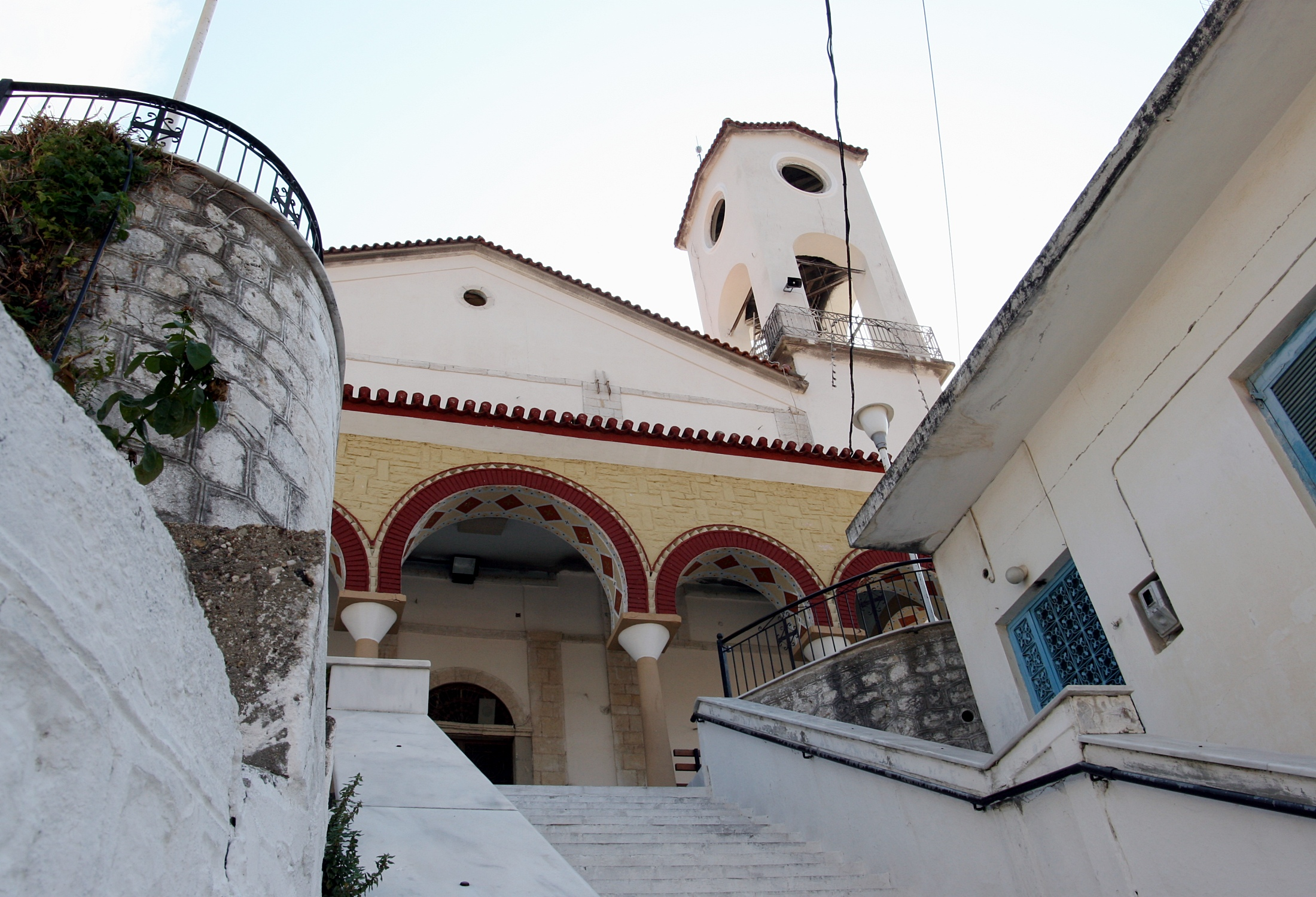
View of the Orthodox church of the city.

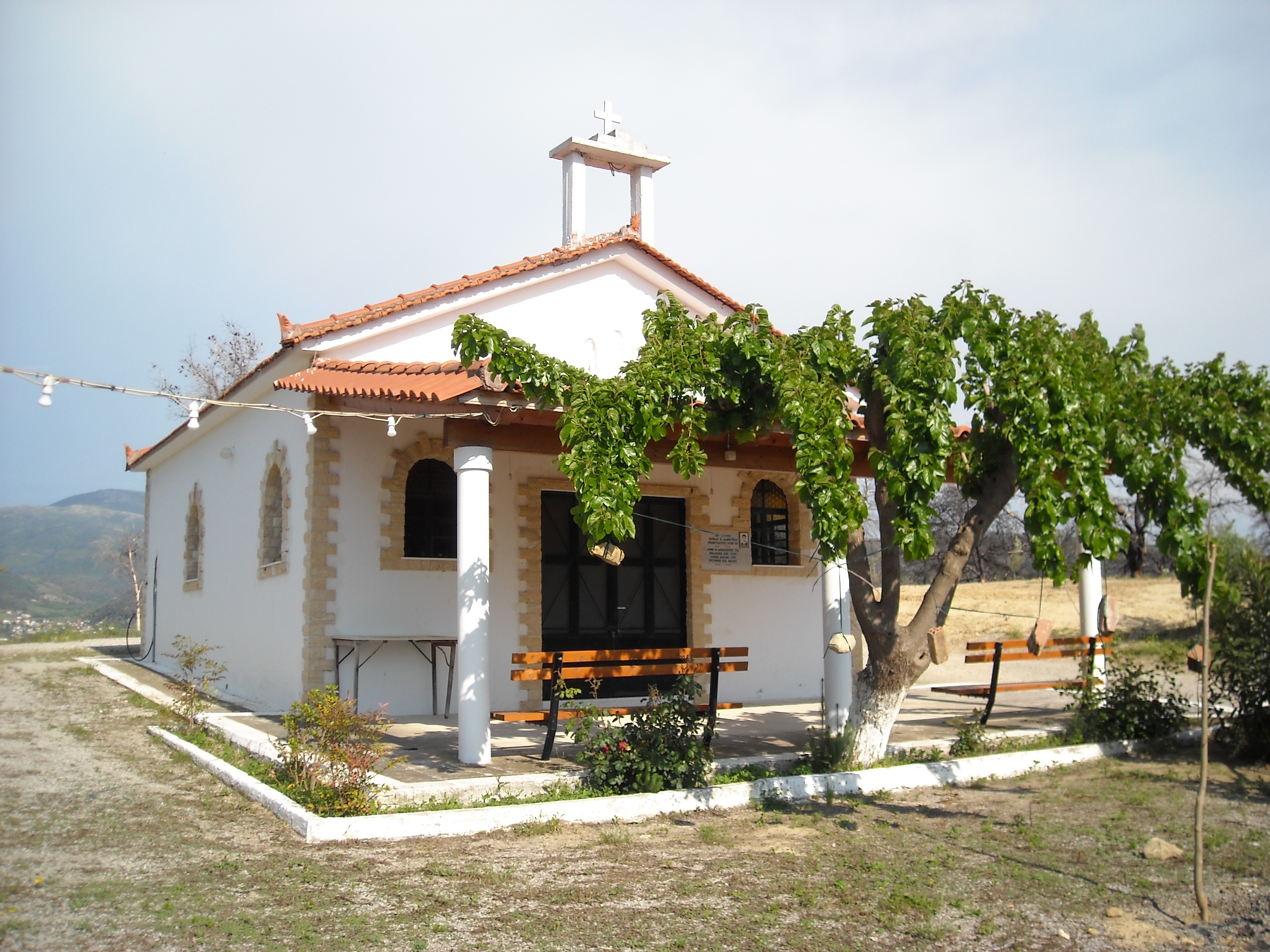
St.Paraskevi's chapel.

== See also ==
- List of settlements in Elis
