= Minthi =

Minthi Μίνθη
- Community
- Location within Greece
- Coordinates: 37°30′N 21°46′E
- Country: Greece
- Administrative region: West Greece
- Regional unit: Elis
- Municipality: Zacharo
- Municipal unit: Zacharo

Population (2021)
  - Community: 58
- Time zone: UTC+2 (EET)
  - Summer (DST): UTC+3 (EEST)

Minthi (Greek: Μίνθη, before 1927: Άλβενα - Alvena) is a mountain village and a community in the municipality of Zacharo, Elis, Greece. The community includes the village Kotroni. It is situated at 760 m elevation on the northern slope of the mountain Minthi (after which it was named), 5 km south of Platiana, 12 km west of Andritsaina and 10 km east of Zacharo. The area of the community is 16,500 hectares.

== Population ==
Year	Population village	Population community
1981	238	-
1991	171	-
2001	144	221
2011	77	86
2021	57	58

== History ==
The oldest mention of the village was the participation of its residents in the Ottoman–Venetian War (1463–1479), in which its leaders were Mitros Alveniotis and Giannis Agrios. In a Venetian census, between 1689 and 1700, it had 42 families and 149 residents. Minthi suffered damage from the 2007 Greek forest fires.

== See also ==
- List of settlements in Elis
