= Mount Lapithas =

Mountain in Greece

Lapithas
- Λαπίθας
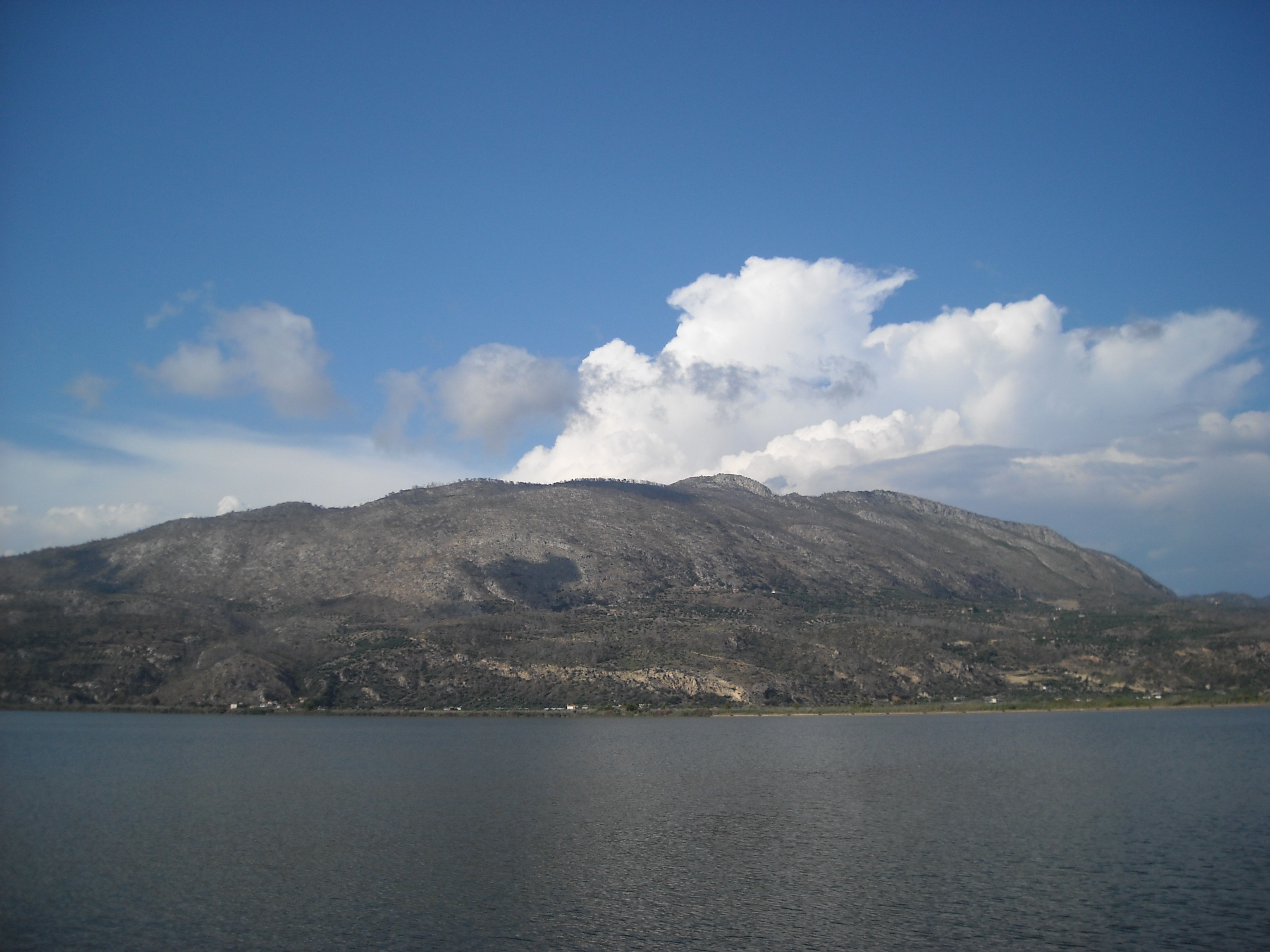

Highest point
- Elevation: 773 m (2,536 ft)
- Coordinates: 37°31′59″N 21°38′38″E

Naming
- Pronunciation: Greek: [laˈpiθas]

Geography
- Location within Greece
- Location: southern Elis, Greece

Lapithas (Greek: Λαπίθας) is a mountain located in southern Elis in the western Peloponnese in Greece. The mountain is named after the legendary people, the Lapiths. In the west the mountain touches the Ionian Sea. It is 15 to 20 km long and 10 km wide and covers and area of 100 to 150 km². A large part of the mountain is covered with pine forests, but has suffered great damage in the forest fires of August 2007.

The Kaiafas Lake lies between the Lapithas and the Ionian Sea, northwest of the town Zacharo. The Greek National Road 76 (Megalopoli - Andritsaina - Krestena) passes northeast of the Lapithas, and the Greek National Road 9/E55 (Patras - Pyrgos - Kalamata) lies to the west.

== Nearest places ==
Smerna, Vrina and Xirochori are villages on the mountain.

- North: Krestena, Gryllos, Graikas
- East: Platiana and Makistos
- South: Zacharo
- West: Kato Samiko
