= William of Champlitte =

First Prince of Achaea

William I
- Prince of Achaea
- Coat of Arms of William of Champlitte
- Reign: 1205–1209
- Successor: Geoffrey I
- Born: 1160s
- Died: 1209
- Spouse: Alais of Meursault; Elisabeth of Mount-Saint-Jean
- House: House of Blois; House of Champlitte
- Father: Odo I of Champlitte
- Mother: Sybille

William I of Champlitte (French: Guillaume de Champlitte) (1160s-1209) was a French knight who joined the Fourth Crusade and became the first prince of Achaea (1205–1209).

== Early years and the Fourth Crusade ==
William was the second son of Odo or Eudes I of Champlitte, viscount of Dijon. He later married Elisabeth of Mount-Saint-Jean, but they divorced in 1199.

William was one of the crusader leaders who signed the letter written in April 1203 by Counts Baldwin IX of Flanders, Louis I of Blois and Chartres and Hugh IV of Saint Pol to Pope Innocent III after the occupation of Zara (now Zadar, Croatia).

The imperial throne was given to Baldwin IX of Flanders on May 16, 1204.

== Foundation of the Principality of Achaea ==
Early in 1205 Geoffrey of Villehardouin, one of William of Champlitte's allies went to the camp of Boniface I of Thessalonica at Nauplia (now Nafplion, Greece). He had earlier occupied some parts of Messenia.

The Peloponnese in the Middle Ages

William in short time occupied Coron (now Koroni, Greece), Kalamata and Kyparissia.

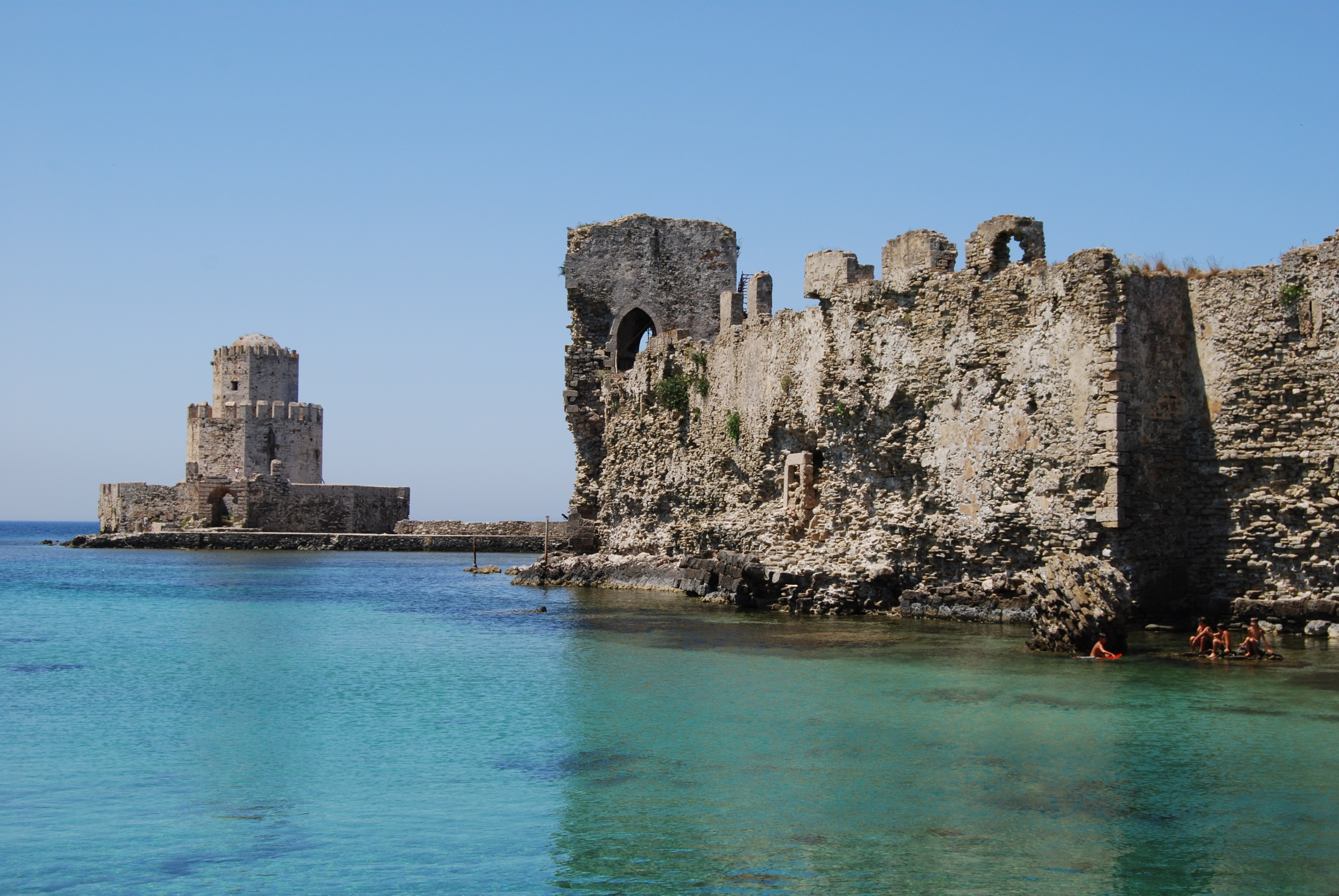
Fortress at Modon (Methoni)

William became the Prince of Achaea during 1205.

While traveling to France, his death occurred during 1208 in Apulia.

== See also ==
- Fourth Crusade
- Principality of Achaea
- Battle of the Olive Grove of Koundouros

== Sources ==
- Andrea, Alfred J. (2000). Contemporary Sources for the Fourth Crusade. Brill. ISBN 90-04-11740-7.
- Evergates, Theodore (2007). The Aristocracy in the County of Champagne, 1100-1300. University of Pennsylvania Press. ISBN 978-0-8122-4019-1.
- Fine, John V. A., Jr. (1994) [1987]. The Late Medieval Balkans: A Critical Survey from the Late Twelfth Century to the Ottoman Conquest. Ann Arbor, Michigan: University of Michigan Press. ISBN 978-0-472-10079-8.
- Longnon, Jean (1969) [1962]. "The Frankish States in Greece, 1204–1311". In Setton, Kenneth M.; Wolff, Robert Lee; Hazard, Harry W. (eds.). A History of the Crusades, Volume II: The Later Crusades, 1189–1311. Vol. 2 (Second ed.). Madison, Milwaukee, and London: University of Wisconsin Press. pp. 234–275. ISBN 0-299-04844-6.
- Runciman, Steven (1954). A History of the Crusades, Volume III: The Kingdom of Acre and the Later Crusades. Vol. 3. Cambridge: Cambridge University Press.
- Setton, Kenneth M. (1976). The Papacy and the Levant (1204–1571), Volume I: The Thirteenth and Fourteenth Centuries. Vol. 1. Philadelphia: The American Philosophical Society. ISBN 0-87169-114-0.

Regnal titles
New title	Prince of Achaea; 1205–1209	Succeeded by Geoffrey I
