= Gulf of Kyparissia =

Natural formation in Greece

Coordinates: 37°30′N 21°25′E

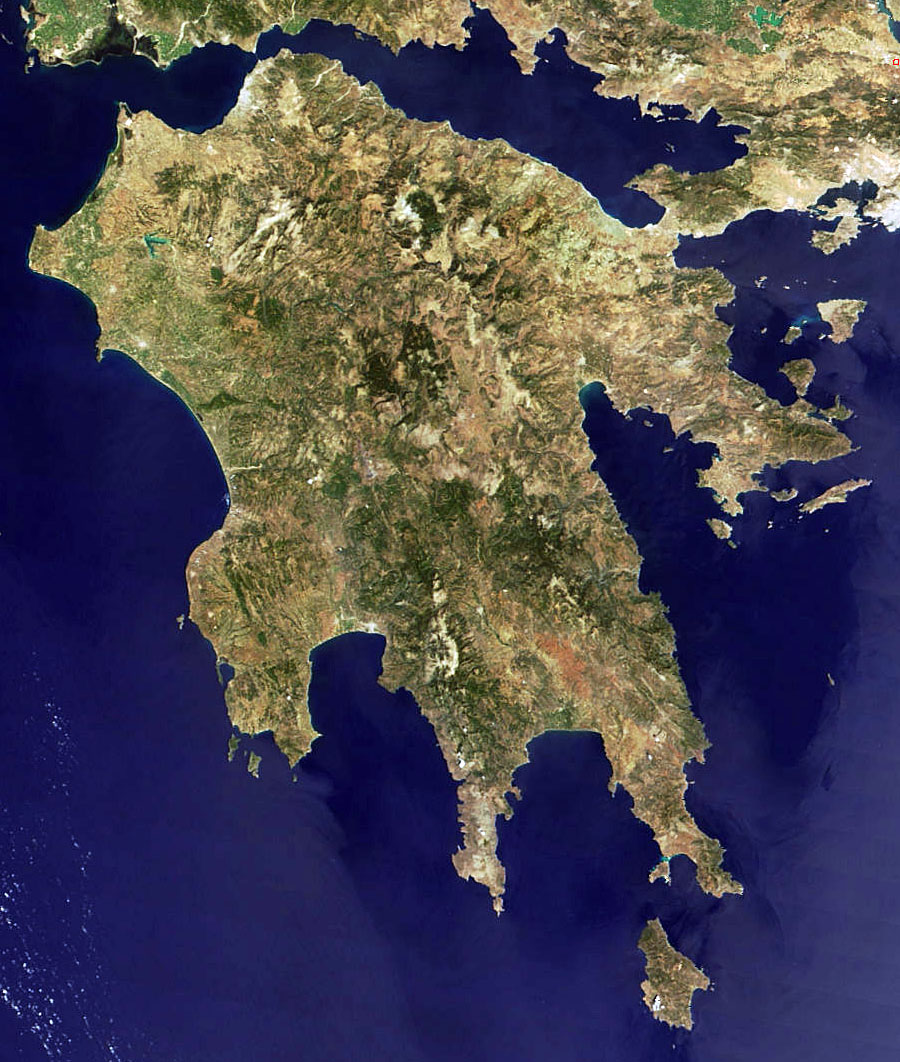
Satellite picture of the Peloponnese peninsula, with the Gulf of Kyparissia on the western coast

The Gulf of Kyparissia (Greek: Κυπαρισσιακός Κόλπος, Kyparissiakos Kolpos) is a long, curving indentation along the western coast of the Peloponnese peninsula, Greece. It lies between Cape Katakolo at the north end and Cape Konello (Akra Kounellos) to the south. Near the northern extreme is the city of Pyrgos, with the town of Zacharo near the center and the town of Kyparissia lying toward the southern end. Flowing into the gulf are the Alpheios and Neda rivers. Its southern part is also one of the main breeding grounds of the endangered loggerhead sea turtle, with 45 kilometers of continuous sandy beach.

During the Middle Ages and up to the 19th century, this body was known as the Gulf of Arcadia.
