= Kyparissia =

Kyparissia Κυπαρισσία
- Municipal unit
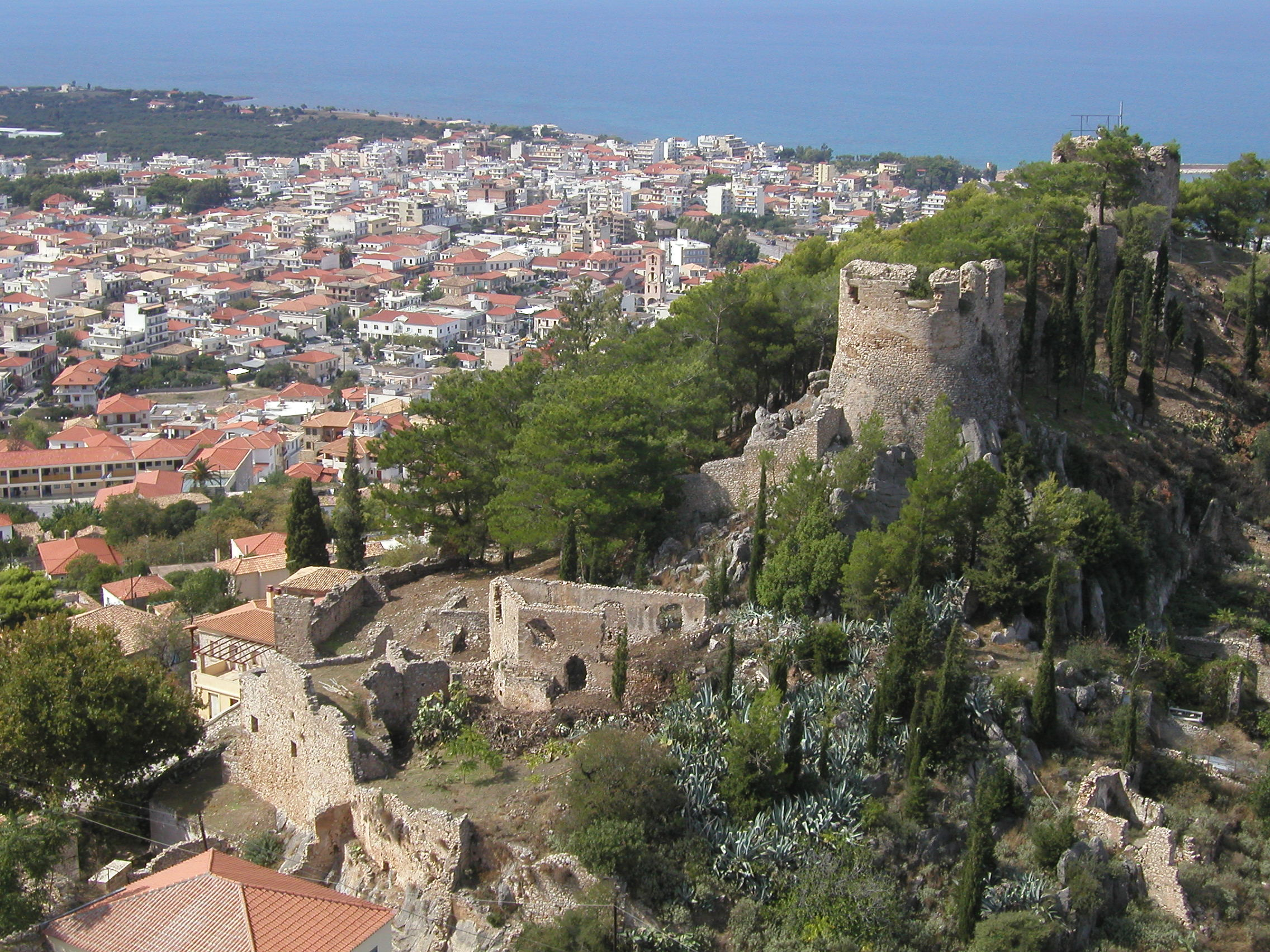

- Location within the regional unit

- Location within Greece
- Coordinates: 37°15′N 21°40′E
- Country: Greece
- Administrative region: Peloponnese
- Regional unit: Messenia
- Municipality: Trifylia

Area
  - Municipal unit: 101.0 km^{2} (39.0 sq mi)
- Elevation: 52 m (171 ft)

Population (2021)
  - Municipal unit: 7,088
  - Municipal unit density: 70.18/km^{2} (181.8/sq mi)
  - Community: 5,763
- Time zone: UTC+2 (EET)
  - Summer (DST): UTC+3 (EEST)
- Postal code: 245 00
- Area code: 2761
- Vehicle registration: ΚΜ
- Website: www.dimostrifylias.gr

Kyparissia (Greek: Κυπαρισσία) is a town and a former municipality in northwestern Messenia, Peloponnese, Greece. Since the 2011 local government reform it is part of the municipality Trifylia, of which it is the seat and a municipal unit. The municipal unit has an area of 101.018 km^{2} (39.003 sq mi). The town proper has around 5,000 inhabitants.

== Geography ==
The town is situated on the Gulf of Kyparissia, a bay of the Ionian Sea, one of the main breeding grounds of the endangered loggerhead sea turtle. Kyparissia is 38 km (24 miles) north of Pylos, 46 km (29 miles) northwest of Kalamata and 51 km (32 miles) southeast of Pyrgos. The Greek National Road 9 (Pyrgos - Methoni) passes through the town. Kyparissia is the terminus of a now disused railway line from Kalo Nero, on the line from Pyrgos to Kalamata. The town has a port, which is mainly used for cargo purposes. On a hill east of the town centre lies a fortress built during the Frankish period.

=== Subdivisions ===
The municipal unit Kyparissia is subdivided into the following communities (constituent villages in brackets):

- Armenioi
- Faraklada
- Kyparissia (Kyparissia, Memi, Blemenianoi, Myloi, Rouzaki, Terpsithea)
- Mouriatada (Mouriatada, Karvouni)
- Myro (Myro, Alimaki)
- Perdikoneri
- Raches
- Spilia
- Stasio
- Vryses
- Xirokampos

== History ==
The ancient Greek town Cyparissia (Ancient Greek: Κυπαρισσία) was already mentioned by Homer in his Iliad.

Ancient writers took note of Cyparissia's beautiful situation upon the sides of one of the offshoots of the range of mountains, which run along this part of the Messenian coast. Upon the narrow summit of the rocks later occupied by a castle built in the Middle Ages, stood the ancient acropolis. There is no harbour upon the Messenian coast north of Pylos; but Leake remarks that the roadstead at Cyparissia seems to be the best on this part of the coast; and in ancient times the town probably possessed an artificial harbour, since traces of a mole may still be seen upon the sea-shore. This was probably constructed on the restoration of Messene by Epaminondas; for it was necessary to provide the capital of the new state with a port, and no spot was so suitable for this object as Cyparissia. Hence we find Messene and the harbour Cyparissia mentioned together by Scylax Pausanias found in the town a temple of Apollo, and one of Athena Cyparissia. The town continued to coin money down to the time of Severus.

Stephanus calls Cyparissia a city of Triphylia, and Strabo also distinguishes between the Triphylian and Messenian Cyparissia, but on what authority we do not know.

At a relatively late stage Cyparissia was a bishopric that today, no longer being residential, is listed by the Catholic Church as a titular see.

In the Middle Ages it was called Arkadía, a name which was transferred from the interior of the peninsula to this place upon the coast. Under the Principality of Achaea, Kyparissia/Arkadia was the seat of the Barony of Arcadia, which was the last Frankish territory (except for the Venetian possessions) to fall to the Despotate of the Morea, in 1432.

In 1460 Kyparissia came under Ottoman control, and remained so, with the exception of thirty years of Venetian rule, until the Greek War of Independence which began in 1821.

Kyparissia continued to bear the name Arkadia till its destruction by Ibrahim Pasha in 1825, during the Greek War of Independence and when rebuilt it resumed its ancient name Cyparissia, by which it is now called. Some remains of ancient walls may be traced around the modern castle; and below the castle on the slope of the hill, near the church of Saint George, are some fragments of columns. On the south side of the town, close to the sea-shore, a fine stream rushes out of the rock and flows into the sea; and a little above is a basin with a spring of water, near which are some stones belonging to an ancient structure. This is the ancient fountain sacred to Dionysus, which Pausanias perceived near the entrance of the city, on the road from Pylus.

== Bishopric ==
Ciparissia once was a (late Byzantine?) bishopric, apparently a suffragan of the Metropolis of Patras, in the sway of the Patriarchate of Constantinople, but it was suppressed without a single historically documented incumbent.

It was nominally restored in 1933 as a titular bishopric of the Roman Catholic Church. It is vacant since decades, having had the following incumbents of the fitting episcopal (lowest) rank:

- Arthur-Alfred Lepailleur, Holy Cross Fathers (C.S.C.) (8 March 1951 – 12 April 1952) as emeritate
- Bishop-elect Joseph Oliver Bowers, Divine Word Missionaries (S.V.D.) (27 November 1952 – 8 January 1953) as Auxiliary Bishop of Accra (Ghana)
- Paul Etoga (3 July 1955 – 24 June 1961) as Auxiliary Bishop of Yaoundé (Cameroon)
- Gregorio Garavito Jiménez, Montfort Missionaries (S.M.M.) (4 December 1961 – 26 April 1969) as Auxiliary Bishop of Villavicencio (Colombia)

== Historical population ==
Year	Community	Municipal unit
1981	4,636	-
1991	5,149	-
2001	5,708	8,648
2011	5,784	7,728
2021	5,763	7,088

== Notable residents ==
- Dimitrios Pitsinis (1925–2003), surgeon
- Konstantinos Lamprinopoulos (1893–1965), mayor of Patras
- Theodoros Roussopoulos (born 1963), journalist, politician
- Kostis Palamas (1859–1943), poet

== See also ==
- List of settlements in Messenia
