= Minthi (mountain) =

Mountain in Greece

- Μίνθη
- Location within Greece

Highest point
- Elevation: 1,345 m (4,413 ft)
- Coordinates: 37°28′23″N 21°51′50″E

Naming
- Pronunciation: Greek: [ˈminθi]

Geography
- Location: southern Elis, Greece

The Minthi (Greek: Μίνθη) is a mountain located in southern Elis in the western Peloponnese, Greece. The mountain is named after the nymph Minthe. It is about 15 km long (from west to east), and about 10 km wide. Its highest summit is 1,345 m. It is situated between the towns Zacharo in the west and Andritsaina in the east. The valley of the river Neda forms its southern border. The sacred mountain Lykaion lies east of the Minthi. The forests on Minthi suffered great damage from the 2007 Greek forest fires.
