= Elis Province =

Coordinates: 37.76°N 21.45°E

Elis Province Επαρχία Ηλείας
- Province of Greece
- 2006
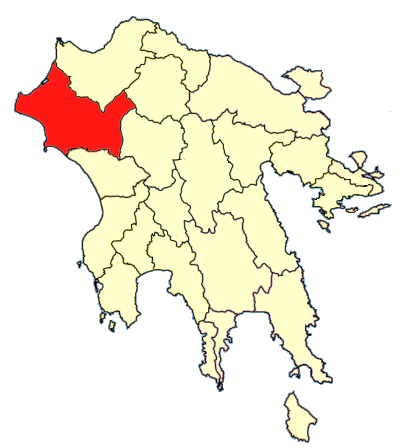
- Capital: Pyrgos

Elis (Greek: Επαρχία Ηλείας – Eparchia Ileias) was one of the provinces of the Elis Prefecture. The seat of administration was Pyrgos. Its territory corresponded with that of the current municipalities Andravida-Kyllini, Ilida, Olympia, Pineios and Pyrgos (except the municipal unit Volakas). It was abolished in 2006.

== Subdivisions ==
The Elis province was subdivided into the following municipalities (situation after the 1997 Kapodistrias reform):

- Amaliada
- Andravida
- Archaia Olympia
- Foloi
- Gastouni
- Iardanos
- Kastro-Kyllini
- Lampeia
- Lasiona
- Lechaina
- Oleni
- Pineia
- Pyrgos
- Tragano
- Vartholomio
- Vouprasia
