= Kampos, Elis =

Kampos Κάμπος
- Community
- Location within Greece
- Coordinates: 37°52′N 21°30′E
- Country: Greece
- Administrative region: West Greece
- Regional unit: Elis
- Municipality: Ilida
- Municipal unit: Pineia
- Elevation: 90 m (300 ft)

Population (2021)
  - Community: 123
- Time zone: UTC+2 (EET)
  - Summer (DST): UTC+3 (EEST)
- Postal code: 270 69
- Area code: 26220
- Vehicle registration: ΗΑ

Kampos (Greek: Κάμπος) is a community in the municipal unit of Pineia, Elis, Greece. It is on the southeastern shore of the Pineios reservoir, 2 km northwest of Efyra, 4 km northeast of Keramidia, 7 km northwest of Simopoulo and 15 km northeast of Amaliada.

== Historical population ==
Year	Population
1981	179
1991	139
2001	172
2011	111
2021	123

== See also ==
- List of settlements in Elis
