= Ephyra =

Ephyra may refer to:

== Places ==
- The ancient city of Cichyrus in Thesprotia, later known as Ephyra before reverting back to its original name
- Ephyra (Aetolia), a city of ancient Aetolia
- Ephyra (Arcadia), a town of ancient Arcadia
- Ephyra (Elis), a city of ancient Elis
- Ephyra (Sicyonia), a city of ancient Sicyonia
- Efyra, a village and an archeological site in Elis, Greece
- Ephyra, ancient name of Ancient Corinth, Greece
- Ephyra, ancient name of Cranon, Thessaly, Greece

== Other uses ==
- Ephyra (mythology):
  - Ephyra, one of the Oceanids
  - Ephyra, one of the Nereids
- Ephyra, a stage of the life cycle of jellyfish
