= Sosti, Elis =

Sosti Σώστι
- Community
- Location within Greece
- Coordinates: 37°52′N 21°21′E
- Country: Greece
- Administrative region: West Greece
- Regional unit: Elis
- Municipality: Ilida
- Municipal unit: Amaliada

Population (2021)
  - Community: 263
- Time zone: UTC+2 (EET)
  - Summer (DST): UTC+3 (EEST)
- Postal code: 272 00
- Area code: 26220
- Vehicle registration: ΗΑ

Sosti (Greek: Σώστι) is a community in the municipal unit of Amaliada, Elis, Greece. It is situated in a rural plain, south of the river Pineios. It is 2 km southwest of Avgeio, 2 km east of Roupaki, 4 km northwest of Chavari, 5 km southeast of Tragano and 8 km north of Amaliada.

== Population ==
Year	Population
1981	358
1991	350
2001	417
2011	308
2021	263

== See also ==
- List of settlements in Elis
