= Pylus (Elis) =

Town in hollow Elis

Coordinates: 37.8500°N 21.5667°E

Pylus or Pylos (Ancient Greek: Πύλος) was a town in hollow Elis, described by Pausanias as situated upon the mountain road leading from Elis to Olympia, and at the place where the Ladon flows into the Pineus. Strabo, in a corrupt passage, assigns to it the same situation, and places it in the neighbourhood of Scollium or Mount Scollis. Pausanias says that it was 80 stadia from the city of Elis. Diodorus gives 70 stadia as the distance, and Pliny the Elder 12 Roman miles.

According to Greek mythology, Pylus is said to have been built by the Pylon, son of Cleson of Megara, who founded the Messenian Pylus, and who, upon being expelled from the latter place by Peleus, settled at this, the Eleian Pylos. Pylus was said to have been destroyed by Heracles, and to have been afterwards restored by the Eleians; but the story of its destruction by Heracles more properly belongs to the Messenian Pylus. Its inhabitants asserted that it was the town which Homer had in view when he asserted in the Iliad that the Alpheius flowed through their territory. On the position of the Homeric Pylus we shall speak presently; and we only observe here, that this claim was admitted by Pausanias, though its absurdity had been previously pointed out by Strabo.

Like the other Eleian towns, Pylus is rarely mentioned in history. In 402 BCE it was taken by the Spartans, in their invasion of the territory of Elis; and in 366 BCE, it is mentioned as the place where the democratical exiles from Elis planted themselves in order to carry on war against the latter city. Pausanias, visiting in the second century of our era, saw only the ruins of Pylus, and it would appear to have been deserted long previously.

The location of Pylus has been identified with the modern village of Agrapidochori, near Pineia.
