= Palaiochori, Elis =

Palaiochori Παλαιοχώρι
- Community
- Location within Greece
- Coordinates: 37°49′N 21°16′E
- Country: Greece
- Administrative region: West Greece
- Regional unit: Elis
- Municipality: Pineios
- Municipal unit: Gastouni

Population (2021)
  - Community: 413
- Time zone: UTC+2 (EET)
  - Summer (DST): UTC+3 (EEST)

Palaiochori (Greek: Παλαιοχώρι) is a village in the municipal unit of Gastouni, Elis, Greece. Palaiochori is situated in a flat rural area, 3 km from the Ionian Sea. It is 2 km west of Savalia, 4 km southeast of Gastouni, 3 km northwest of Roviata and 8 km northwest of Amaliada. The mouth of the river Pineios is near Palaiochori.

== Historical population ==
Year	Population
1981	312
1991	359
2001	394
2011	461
2021	413

== See also ==
- List of settlements in Elis
