= Lefkochori =

Lefkochori Λευκοχώρι
- Community
- Location within Greece
- Coordinates: 37°52.3′N 21°16.3′E
- Country: Greece
- Administrative region: West Greece
- Regional unit: Elis
- Municipality: Pineios
- Municipal unit: Gastouni

Population (2021)
  - Community: 494
- Time zone: UTC+2 (EET)
  - Summer (DST): UTC+3 (EEST)
- Postal code: 273 00

Lefkochori (Greek: Λευκοχώρι) is a village in the municipal unit of Gastouni, Elis. It is situated in a flat rural area, on the left bank of the river Pineios, at about 10 m elevation. It is 1 km southeast of Kavasila, 2 km northwest of Koroivos, 3 km west of Agia Mavra and 3 km northeast of Gastouni. The Greek National Road 9 (Patras to Pyrgos) and the railway from Patras to Pyrgos pass west of the village.

== Population history ==
Historical population
Year	Pop.	±%
1981	401	—
1991	549	+36.9%
2001	635	+15.7%
2011	546	−14.0%
2021	494	−9.5%

== See also ==
- List of settlements in Elis
