= Roupaki =

Roupaki Ρουπάκι
- Community
- Location within Greece
- Coordinates: 37°51.8′N 21°19.4′E
- Country: Greece
- Administrative region: West Greece
- Regional unit: Elis
- Municipality: Pineios
- Municipal unit: Gastouni
- Elevation: 30 m (98 ft)

Population (2021)
  - Community: 468
- Time zone: UTC+2 (EET)
  - Summer (DST): UTC+3 (EEST)
- Postal code: 273 00
- Area code: 26220

Roupaki (Greek: Ρουπάκι) is a community in the municipal unit of Gastouni, Elis, Greece. It is situated in a flat, rural area, south of the river Pineios. It is 2 km southeast of Agia Mavra, 2 km west of Sosti, 2 km east of Koroivos, 6 km east of Gastouni and 8 km northwest of Amaliada.

== Historical population ==
Year	Population
1981	372
1991	423
2001	591
2011	543
2021	468

== See also ==
- List of settlements in Elis
