= Kalyvia =

Kalyvia (Greek: Καλύβια) may refer to several villages in Greece:

- Kalyvia, Aetolia-Acarnania, a village in Aetolia-Acarnania
- Kalyvia, Euboea, a village in Euboea
- Kalyvia, Heraklion, a village in the Heraklion regional unit
- Kalyvia, Laconia, a village in Laconia
- Kalyvia, Larissa, a village in Larissa
- Kalyvia, Messenia, a village in Messenia
- Kalyvia, Pella, a village in the Pella regional unit
- Kalyvia, Skiathos, a village on the island of Skiathos
- Kalyvia Analipseos, a village in the Larissa regional unit
- Kalyvia Ilidos, a village in Elis, part of Amaliada
- Kalyvia Myrtountion, a village in Elis, part of Vartholomio
- Kalyvia Thorikou, a municipality in East Attica
- Megala Kalyvia, a municipality in the Trikala regional unit
