= Agios Dimitrios, Elis =

Agios Dimitrios Άγιος Δημήτριος
- Community
- Location within Greece
- Coordinates: 37°54′N 21°24′E
- Country: Greece
- Administrative region: West Greece
- Regional unit: Elis
- Municipality: Ilida
- Municipal unit: Amaliada
- Elevation: 40 m (130 ft)

Population (2021)
  - Community: 227
- Time zone: UTC+2 (EET)
  - Summer (DST): UTC+3 (EEST)
- Postal code: 270 69
- Area code: 26220
- Vehicle registration: ΗΑ

Agios Dimitrios (Greek: Άγιος Δημήτριος meaning Saint Demetrius) is a village and a community in the municipal unit of Amaliada, northern Elis, Peloponnese, Greece. It is situated on the left bank of the river Pineios, 3 km (1.9 mi) west of the Pineios reservoir. It is 3 km (1.9 mi) west of Kentro, 3 km (1.9 mi) northeast of Archaia Ilida (ancient Elis), 12 km (7.5 mi) east of Andravida and 12 km (7.5 mi) northeast of Amaliada. The community Agios Dimitrios includes the village Kolokythas.

== Historical population ==
Year	Village population	Population community
1981	474	-
1991	386	-
2001	433	562
2011	261	382
2021	147	227

== See also ==
- List of settlements in Elis
