= Peristeri, Elis =

Peristeri Περιστέρι
- Community
- Location within Greece
- Coordinates: 37°48′N 21°28′E
- Country: Greece
- Administrative region: West Greece
- Regional unit: Elis
- Municipality: Ilida
- Municipal unit: Amaliada

Population (2021)
  - Community: 324
- Time zone: UTC+2 (EET)
  - Summer (DST): UTC+3 (EEST)
- Vehicle registration: ΗΑ

Peristeri (Greek: Περιστέρι meaning pigeon) is a village and a community in the municipal unit of Amaliada, Elis, Greece. It is located in a rural, hilly area, 5 km southeast of Dafniotissa, 7 km southwest of Efyra, 9 km northwest of Karatoula and 11 km east of Amaliada. The community includes the villages Asteraiika and Palaiolanthi.

== Population ==
Year	Village population	Community population
1981	-	528
1991	406	-
2001	452	540
2011	309	363
2021	287	324

== See also ==
- List of settlements in Elis
