= Dafniotissa =

Dafniotissa Δαφνιώτισσα
- Community
- Location within Greece
- Coordinates: 37°50′N 21°27′E
- Country: Greece
- Administrative region: West Greece
- Regional unit: Elis
- Municipality: Ilida
- Municipal unit: Amaliada
- Elevation: 150 m (490 ft)

Population (2021)
  - Community: 218
- Time zone: UTC+2 (EET)
  - Summer (DST): UTC+3 (EEST)
- Postal code: 270 69
- Area code: 26220
- Website: Dafniotissa

Dafniotissa (Greek: Δαφνιώτισσα), is a village in the eastern part of the municipal unit of Amaliada, Elis, Greece. It is situated in the hills southwest of the Pineios reservoir. It is 1 km south of Keramidia, 3 km southeast of Dafni, 5 km west of Efyra and 10 km northeast of Amaliada.

== Historical population ==
| Year | Population |
|---|---|
| 1981 | 443 |
| 1991 | 449 |
| 2001 | 459 |
| 2011 | 366 |
| 2021 | 218 |

== See also ==
- List of settlements in Elis
