= Kardiakafti =

Kardiakafti Καρδιακαύτι
- Community
- Location within Greece
- Coordinates: 37°52.6′N 21°14.5′E
- Country: Greece
- Administrative region: West Greece
- Regional unit: Elis
- Municipality: Pineios
- Municipal unit: Gastouni

Population (2021)
  - Community: 576
- Time zone: UTC+2 (EET)
  - Summer (DST): UTC+3 (EEST)
- Postal code: 273 00
- Area code: 26230
- Vehicle registration: ΗΑ

Kardiakafti (Greek: Καρδιακαύτι) is a village in the northwestern part of the municipal unit of Gastouni in Elis, Greece. It is situated in a flat rural area, on the right bank of the river Pineios. It is 2 km west of Kavasila, 2 km southeast of Dimitra, 3 km northwest of Gastouni and 3 km northeast of Vartholomio.

== Population ==
Year	Population
1981	508
1991	612
2001	643
2011	651
2021	576

== See also ==
- List of settlements in Elis
