= Dimitra, Elis =

Dimitra Δήμητρα
- Community
- Location within Greece
- Coordinates: 37°53′N 21°13′E
- Country: Greece
- Administrative region: West Greece
- Regional unit: Elis
- Municipality: Pineios
- Municipal unit: Vartholomio
- Elevation: 15 m (49 ft)

Population (2021)
  - Community: 334
- Time zone: UTC+2 (EET)
  - Summer (DST): UTC+3 (EEST)

Dimitra (Greek: Δήμητρα, before 1955: Τρουμπές - Troumpes) is a village and a community in the municipal unit of Vartholomio, Elis, Greece. It is situated in a rural plain, north of the river Pineios. It is 2 km northwest of Kardiakafti, 2 km east of Machos, 3 km southeast of Neochori and 3 km northeast of Vartholomio. The community includes the small village Regklaiika. Between 1835 and 1912 Dimitra was part of the municipality of Myrtountia. Between 1912 and 1933 it was part of the community of Kardiakafti. Between 1933 and 1997, when it joined the municipality of Vartholomio, it was an independent community.

== Population ==
Year	Settlement population	Community population
1981	172	-
1991	368	-
2001	283	307
2011	296	324
2021	308	334

== See also ==
- List of settlements in Elis
