= Keramidia =

Keramidia Κεραμιδιά
- Community
- Location within Greece
- Coordinates: 37°51′N 21°27′E
- Country: Greece
- Administrative region: West Greece
- Regional unit: Elis
- Municipality: Ilida
- Municipal unit: Amaliada

Area
  - Community: 6.98 km^{2} (2.69 sq mi)
- Elevation: 100 m (330 ft)

Population (2021)
  - Community: 235
  - Density: 33.7/km^{2} (87.2/sq mi)
- Time zone: UTC+2 (EET)
  - Summer (DST): UTC+3 (EEST)
- Postal code: 270 69
- Area code: 26220

Keramidia (Greek: Κεραμιδιά), is a village in the northeastern part of the municipal unit of Amaliada, Elis, Greece. It is located in a rural area near the southwestern corner of the Pineios reservoir, 1 km north of Dafniotissa, 3 km east of Dafni, 3 km south of Agios Ilias, 5 km west of Efyra and 11 km northeast of Amaliada.

== Historical population ==
Year	Population
1981	480
1991	345
2001	543
2011	526
2021	235

== See also ==
- List of settlements in Elis
