= Dafni, Amaliada =

Dafni Δάφνη
- Community
- Location within Greece
- Coordinates: 37°52′N 21°26′E
- Country: Greece
- Administrative region: West Greece
- Regional unit: Elis
- Municipality: Ilida
- Municipal unit: Amaliada
- Elevation: 195 m (640 ft)

Population (2021)
  - Community: 271
- Time zone: UTC+2 (EET)
  - Summer (DST): UTC+3 (EEST)
- Postal code: 270 69
- Area code: 26220
- Vehicle registration: ΗΑ

Dafni (Greek: Δάφνη, meaning "laurel", before 1957: Δάμιζα - Damiza) is a village and a community in the municipal unit of Amaliada, Elis, Greece. It is situated in a hilly, rural area, 3 km west of Keramidia, 4 km northeast of Chavari, 10 km northeast of Amaliada and 13 km west of Simopoulo. There is an archaeological site near Dafni. The community Dafni consists of the villages Dafni and Kalathas.

== Historical population ==
Year	Population village	Population community
1981	315	-
1991	130	-
2001	528	585
2011	515	543
2021	251	271

== See also ==
- List of settlements in Elis
