= Agios Ilias, Amaliada =

Agios Ilias Άγιος Ηλίας
- Community
- Location within Greece
- Coordinates: 37°53′N 21°27′E
- Country: Greece
- Administrative region: West Greece
- Regional unit: Elis
- Municipality: Ilida
- Municipal unit: Amaliada
- Elevation: 90 m (300 ft)

Population (2021)
  - Community: 296
- Time zone: UTC+2 (EET)
  - Summer (DST): UTC+3 (EEST)
- Postal code: 270 69
- Area code: 26220
- Vehicle registration: ΗΑ

Agios Ilias (Greek: Άγιος Ηλίας meaning Saint Elias) is a village located in the municipal unit of Amaliada, northern Elis, Peloponnese, Greece. It is situated near the western shore of the Pineios reservoir, 2 km southeast of Kentro, 3 km north of Keramidia and 13 km northeast of Amaliada.

== Historical population ==
| Year | Population |
|---|---|
| 1981 | 145 |
| 1991 | 409 |
| 2001 | 413 |
| 2011 | 302 |
| 2021 | 296 |

== See also ==
- List of settlements in Elis
