= Agia Triada =

Agia Triada, Ayia Triada, or Hagia Triada is Greek for Holy Trinity (Αγία Τριάδα), and common toponym. It may refer to:

- Hagia Triada, an archaeological site of the Minoan civilization in Crete, Greece
- Agia Triada, Boeotia, a village in Boeotia, Greece
- Agia Triada, Corfu, a village in Corfu, Greece
- Agia Triada, Elis, a village in Elis, Greece
- Agia Triada, Eretria, an islet close to Eretria, Greece
- Agia Triada, Evrytania, a village in Evrytania, Greece, Greece
- Agia Triada, Kastoria, a municipal unit in Kastoria regional unit, Greece
- Agia Triada, Lasithi, a village in Lasithi, Greece
- Agia Triada, Limassol, a quarter in Limassol, Cyprus
- Agia Triada, Magnesia, a village in Magnesia, Greece
- Agia Triada, Phthiotis, a village in Phthiotis, Greece
- Agia Triada, Thessaloniki, a village in the Thessaloniki regional unit, Greece
- Agia Triada, Trikala, a village in the Trikala regional unit, Greece
- Agia Triada, Cyprus, home to a basilica of the same name

== Churches and monasteries ==
- Hagia Triada Cathedral, Piraeus
- Agia Triada Monastery, Crete, Greece
- Hagia Triada Church, Ayvalık
- Hagia Triada Church, Istanbul
- Monastery of the Holy Trinity, Meteora
