= Savalia =

Savalia Σαβάλια
- Community
- Location within Greece
- Coordinates: 37°49′N 21°17′E
- Country: Greece
- Administrative region: West Greece
- Regional unit: Elis
- Municipality: Ilida
- Municipal unit: Amaliada
- Elevation: 5 m (16 ft)

Population (2021)
  - Community: 1,101
- Time zone: UTC+2 (EET)
  - Summer (DST): UTC+3 (EEST)
- Postal code: 272 00
- Vehicle registration: ΗΑ

Savalia (Greek: Σαβάλια) is a village in the municipal unit of Amaliada, Elis, southern Greece. It is in the plains near the Ionian Sea, 1 km (0.62 mi) northwest of Roviata, 2 km (1.2 mi) southwest of Ampelokampos, 3 km (1.9 mi) east of Palaiochori, 5 km (3.1 mi) southeast of Gastouni, and 5 km (3.1 mi) northwest of Amaliada. The Greek National Road 9 (Patras–Pyrgos) passes southwest of the village. The railway from Patras to Pyrgos passes northeast of the village.

Year	Population
1981	1,186
1991	1,119
2001	1,273
2011	1,206
2021	1,101

== See also ==
- List of settlements in Elis
