= Koroivos =

Koroivos Κόροιβος
- Community
- Location within Greece
- Coordinates: 37°52′N 21°18′E
- Country: Greece
- Administrative region: West Greece
- Regional unit: Elis
- Municipality: Pineios
- Municipal unit: Gastouni
- Elevation: 10 m (33 ft)

Population (2021)
  - Community: 339
- Time zone: UTC+2 (EET)
  - Summer (DST): UTC+3 (EEST)
- Postal code: 273 00
- Area code: 026230

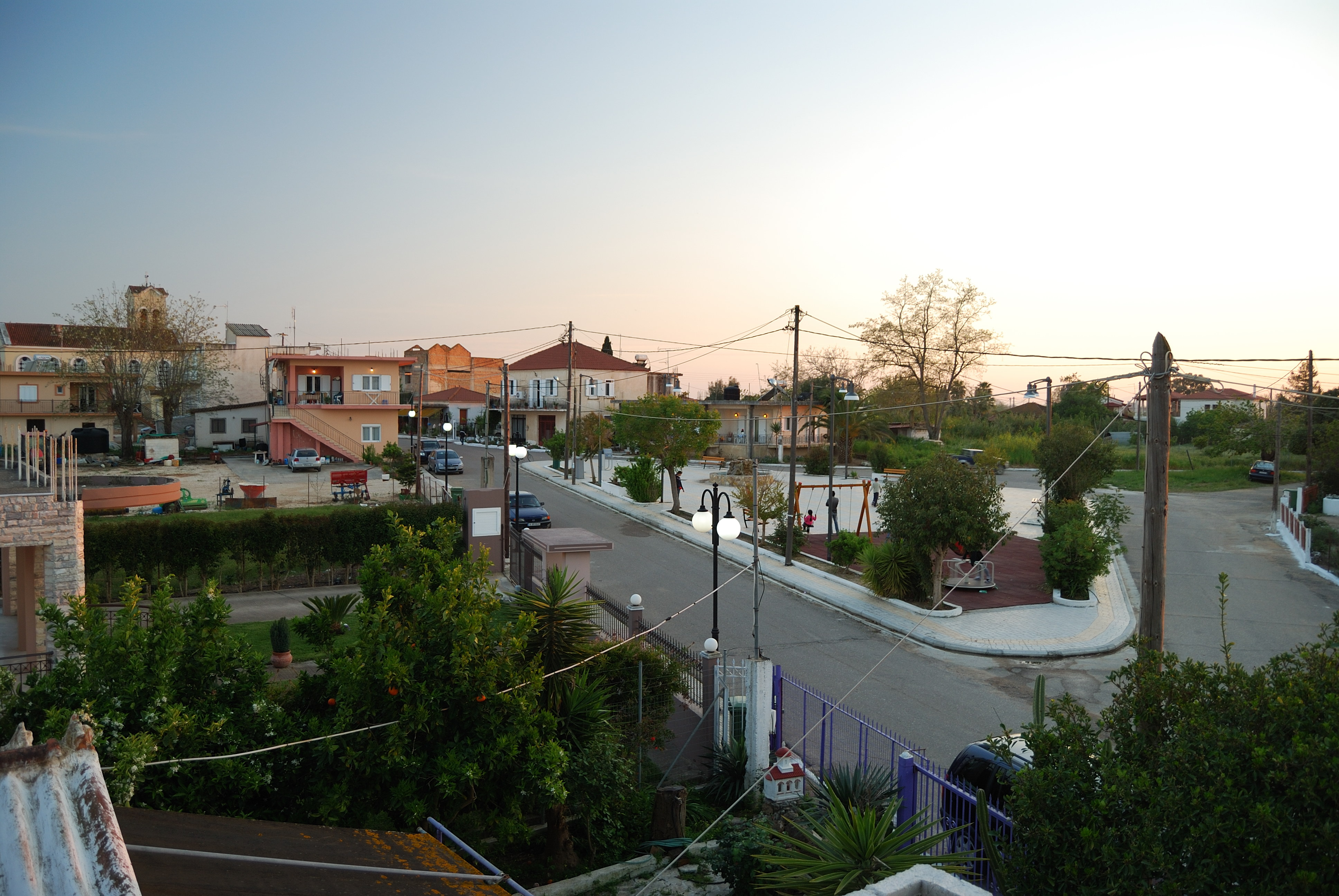

Koroivos (Greek: Κόροιβος, before 1955: Κελεβή - Kelevi) is a village in the municipal unit of Gastouni, Elis, Greece. It is situated in a flat rural area, south of the river Pineios. It is 2 km southeast of Lefkochori, 2 km west of Roupaki, 2 km southwest of Agia Mavra and 4 km east of Gastouni. The village was named after Coroebus of Elis, one of the winners of the first Ancient Olympic Games.Today, there is a Cultural Center in the village, while only a kindergarten is open, since the primary school was closed due to lack of children. In the center of the village dominates the temple of Agia Paraskevi, as well as the large square. The small church of the village cemetery, which is preserved to this day, dates from the era of Ottoman rule. The main activity and source of income for the inhabitants of Koroivos is agriculture and animal husbandry.

Year	Population
1981	369
1991	377
2001	363
2011	316
2021	339

== See also ==
- List of settlements in Elis
- Coroebus of Elis
