= Peneus (disambiguation) =

Peneus is a river god in Greek mythology.

Peneus, Peneius or Pineios (Greek: Πηνειός) may also refer to:

- Pineios (Thessaly), a river in Thessaly, Greece
- Pineios (Peloponnese), a river in Peloponnese, Greece
- Pineios (municipality), a municipality in Elis, Western Greece
- Peneius (moon), moon of the asteroid 41 Daphne
