= Kalyvia Myrtountion =

Kalyvia Myrtountion Καλύβια Μυρτουντίων
- Community
- Location within Greece
- Coordinates: 37°51′N 21°13′E
- Country: Greece
- Administrative region: West Greece
- Regional unit: Elis
- Municipality: Pineios
- Municipal unit: Vartholomio

Population (2021)
  - Community: 207
- Time zone: UTC+2 (EET)
  - Summer (DST): UTC+3 (EEST)

Kalyvia Myrtountion (Greek: Καλύβια Μυρτουντίων) is a village in the municipal unit of Vartholomio, Elis, Greece. It is situated in a flat, rural area, on the right bank of the river Pineios, 4 km from the Ionian Sea. It is 1 km southeast of Vartholomio and 3 km west of Gastouni. In the local government reform under the Capodistrian Plan in 1997 it became a part of the municipality of Vartholomio. The patron saint of Kalyvia is Saint John Chrysostom.

== Population ==
| Year | Population |
|---|---|
| 1981 | 147 |
| 1991 | 177 |
| 2001 | 159 |
| 2011 | 139 |
| 2021 | 207 |

== See also ==
- List of settlements in Elis
