= Ampelokampos =

Ampelokampos Αμπελόκαμπος
- Community
- Location within Greece
- Coordinates: 37°50′N 21°19′E
- Country: Greece
- Administrative region: West Greece
- Regional unit: Elis
- Municipality: Ilida
- Municipal unit: Amaliada
- Elevation: 5 m (16 ft)

Population (2021)
  - Community: 345
- Time zone: UTC+2 (EET)
  - Summer (DST): UTC+3 (EEST)
- Postal code: 272 00
- Area code: 26220
- Vehicle registration: ΗΑ

Ampelokampos (Greek: Αμπελόκαμπος) is a village in the municipal unit of Amaliada, northern Elis, Greece. It is situated in the plains near the Ionian Sea, 2 km northeast of Savalia, 5 km northwest of Amaliada and 5 km southeast of Gastouni. The railway from Patras to Pyrgos runs south of the village.

| Year | Population |
|---|---|
| 1981 | 621 |
| 1991 | 645 |
| 2001 | 517 |
| 2011 | 468 |
| 2021 | 345 |

== See also ==
- List of settlements in Elis
