= Kalyvia Ilidos =

Kalyvia Ilidos Καλύβια Ήλιδος
- Community
- Location within Greece
- Coordinates: 37°53′N 21°22′E
- Country: Greece
- Administrative region: West Greece
- Regional unit: Elis
- Municipality: Ilida
- Municipal unit: Amaliada

Population (2021)
  - Community: 314
- Time zone: UTC+2 (EET)
  - Summer (DST): UTC+3 (EEST)
- Postal code: 273 00
- Vehicle registration: ΗΑ

Kalyvia Ilidos (Greek: Καλύβια Ήλιδος) is a village in the northern part of the municipal unit of Amaliada, Elis, Greece. It is located near the left bank of the river Pineios, 1 km northeast of Avgeio, 1 km west of Archaia Ilida (ancient Elis), 10 km north of Amaliada and 11 km northeast of Gastouni.

== Historical population ==
| Year | Population |
|---|---|
| 1981 | 424 |
| 1991 | 429 |
| 2001 | 365 |
| 2011 | 435 |
| 2021 | 314 |

== See also ==
- List of settlements in Elis
