= Kentro, Elis =

Kentro Κέντρο
- Community
- Location within Greece
- Coordinates: 37°53.8′N 21°26.8′E
- Country: Greece
- Administrative region: West Greece
- Regional unit: Elis
- Municipality: Ilida
- Municipal unit: Amaliada

Area
  - Community: 3.65 km^{2} (1.41 sq mi)
- Elevation: 90 m (300 ft)

Population (2021)
  - Community: 493
  - Density: 135/km^{2} (350/sq mi)
- Time zone: UTC+2 (EET)
  - Summer (DST): UTC+3 (EEST)
- Postal code: 270 69
- Area code: +30-2622
- Vehicle registration: HA

Kentro (Greek: Κέντρο) is a village and a community of the Ilida municipality. Before the 2011 local government reform it was a part of the municipality of Amaliada, of which it was a municipal district.

== Geography ==
It is situated on the west shore of the dam Pineios. The reservoir was created in the 1960s. Kentro is 2 km northwest of Agios Ilias, 3 km east of Agios Dimitrios, 3 km south of Borsi and 14 km northeast of Amaliada. The community of Kentro covers an area of 3.65 km^{2}.

== Historical population ==
Historical population
Year	Pop.	±%
1981	337	—
1991	445	+32.0%
2001	479	+7.6%
2011	462	−3.5%
2021	493	+6.7%

== See also ==
- List of settlements in Elis
