= Thalamae =

Thalamae or Thalamai (Ancient Greek: Θαλάμαι) may refer to:

- Thalamae (Elis), a town of ancient Elis
- Thalamae (Laconia), a town of ancient Laconia, containing an oracle
