= Markopoulo, Elis =

Markopoulo Μαρκόπουλο
- Settlement
- Location within Greece
- Coordinates: 37°54′N 21°20′E
- Country: Greece
- Administrative region: West Greece
- Regional unit: Elis
- Municipality: Pineios
- Municipal unit: Tragano
- Community: Tragano

Population (2021)
  - Total: 195
- Time zone: UTC+2 (EET)
  - Summer (DST): UTC+3 (EEST)
- Vehicle registration: ΗΑ

Markopoulo (Greek: Μαρκόπουλο) is a settlement in the municipal unit of Tragano, Elis, Greece. It is about 1 km east of Tragano, on the road to Borsi, 1.5 km north of the river Pineios.

== Population ==
Year	Population
1991	165
2001	169
2011	125
2021	195

== Economy ==
Its main production are fruits including watermelon, melon, figs and vegetables including corn, tomatoes, potatoes, onions, cucumbers and others as well as dairy, livestock, olives and others.

== See also ==
- List of settlements in the Elis prefecture
