= Agia Mavra =

Agia Mavra may refer to various locations in Greece:

- Agia Mavra, Elis, a village in Elis
- Agia Mavra, Lefkada, a village in the island of Lefkada
