= Pineia =

Pineia Πηνεία
- Municipal unit
- Location within the regional unit

- Location within Greece
- Coordinates: 37°51′N 21°34′E
- Country: Greece
- Administrative region: West Greece
- Regional unit: Elis
- Municipality: Ilida

Area
  - Municipal unit: 148.6 km^{2} (57.4 sq mi)
- Elevation: 15 m (49 ft)

Population (2021)
  - Municipal unit: 3,032
  - Municipal unit density: 20.40/km^{2} (52.85/sq mi)
- Time zone: UTC+2 (EET)
  - Summer (DST): UTC+3 (EEST)
- Postal code: 270 69
- Area code: 26220
- Vehicle registration: ΗΑ

Pineia (Greek: Πηνεία) is a former municipality in Elis, West Greece, Greece. Since the 2011 local government reform it is part of the municipality Ilida, of which it is a municipal unit. The municipal unit has an area of 148.572 km^{2}. Its seat of administration was in the village Simopoulo. Pineia is named after the river Pineios, which forms its northern border. The area is hilly and sparsely populated. It is about 20 km east of Amaliada, 25 km northeast of Pyrgos and 45 km southwest of Patras.

== Subdivisions ==
The municipal unit Pineia is subdivided into the following communities (constituent villages in brackets):

- Agnanta (Agnanta, Ampelakia)
- Agrapidochori (Agrapidochori, Valmi, Kotrona)
- Anthonas (Anthonas, Kalo Paidi)
- Avgi (Avgi, Oraia)
- Efyra (Efyra, Pirio)
- Kampos
- Laganas
- Latas
- Loukas (Loukas, Prinari)
- Mazaraki (Mazaraki, Apidoula, Prodromos)
- Oinoi
- Rodia (Rodia, Akropotamia)
- Simopoulo (Simopoulo, Agios Nikolaos)
- Skliva
- Velanidi (Velanidi, Roupakia, Souli)
- Vouliagmeni (Vouliagmeni, Gavrakia)

== Historical population ==
Year	Population
1991	5,221
2001	5,660
2011	3,699
2021	3,032

== See also ==
- List of settlements in Elis
