= Machos, Elis =

Machos Μάχος
- Community
- Location within Greece
- Coordinates: 37°53′N 21°12′E
- Country: Greece
- Administrative region: West Greece
- Regional unit: Elis
- Municipality: Pineios
- Municipal unit: Vartholomio

Population (2021)
  - Community: 385
- Time zone: UTC+2 (EET)
  - Summer (DST): UTC+3 (EEST)
- Area code: 26230

Machos (Greek: Μάχος, Greek pronunciation: [ˈmaxos]) is a community in the municipal unit of Vartholomio, northwestern Elis, Greece. It is situated in a rural plain, 2 km west of Dimitra, 3 km southwest of Neochori and 2 km northwest of Vartholomio.

== Population ==
Year	Population
1981	359
1991	684
2001	470
2011	378
2021	385

== See also ==
- List of settlements in Elis
