= Hippodrome of Olympia =

Track for chariot and horse racing at the Ancient Olympic Games

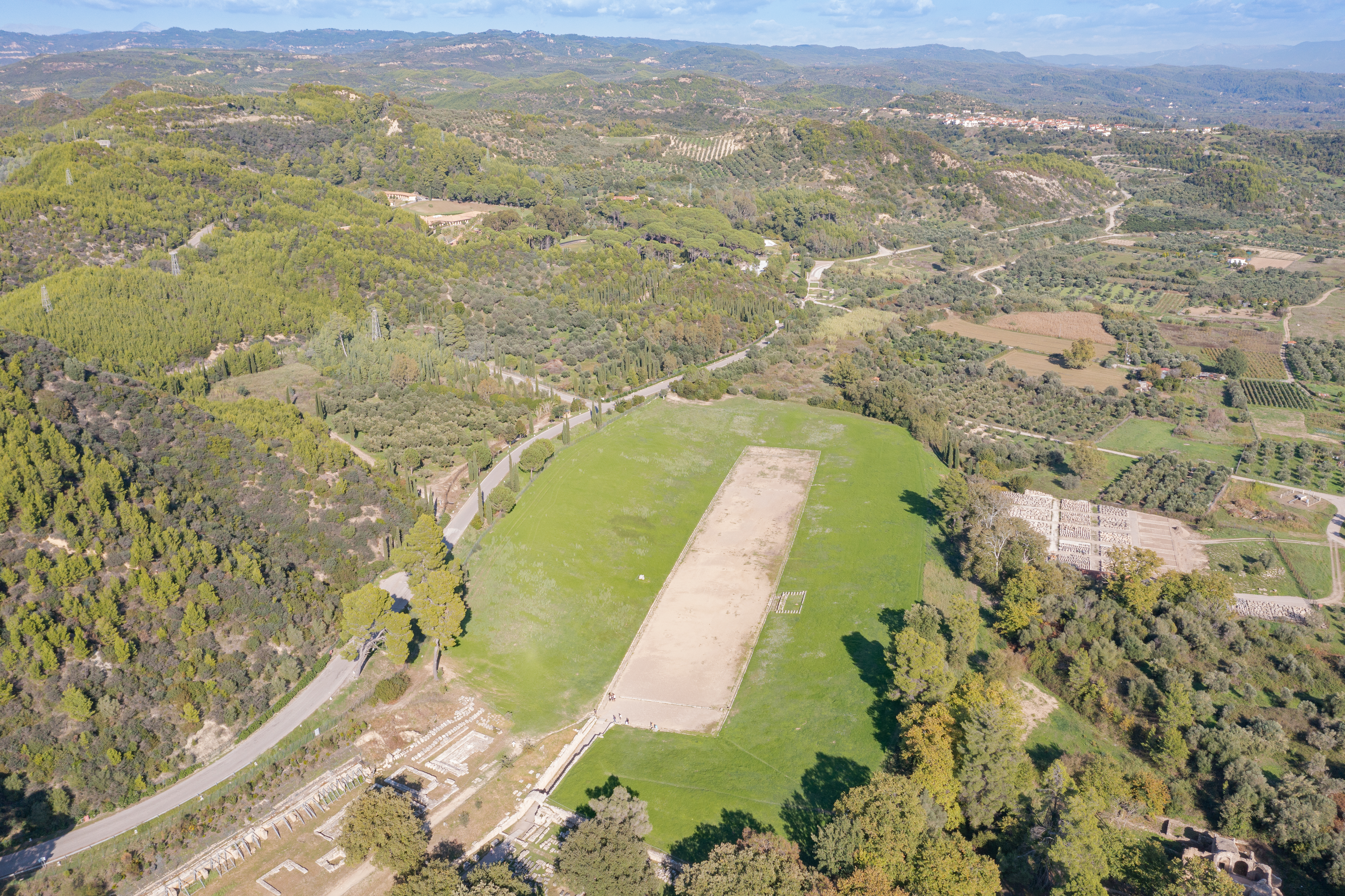
Aerial view of the Ancient Olympia Stadium, Greece

The Hippodrome of Olympia was the hippodrome used for horse racing and chariot racing at the Ancient Olympic Games in Olympia, Greece. It was east of the Altis and south of the stadium. The course is known from ancient texts, reconstructions and geophysical survey; no above-ground remains of the course survive.

== Course ==
Pausanias wrote that the horse-racing area was reached after passing beyond the stadium, at the point where the Hellanodikai sat. The starting-place had the form of a ship's prow. Each side was more than 400 feet long and contained stalls assigned by lot. A cord stood before the chariots and horses as a barrier.

The course had one side longer than the other. On the longer side, Pausanias placed the Taraxippus, a structure connected with danger to horses and charioteers. A turning post stood near the Taraxippus, and the finish was at the statue of Hippodameia. Spectators were placed by a rampart on the south side and on hills to the north; sources do not indicate stone stands like those of Roman circuses.

The dimensions of the hippodrome have been reconstructed from literary sources. The Hellenic Ministry of Culture gives the course as four stadia, about 780 m (2,560 ft), long and one stadium and four plethra, about 220 m (720 ft), wide. Müller, Wacker and Senff, citing J. Ebert's reading of the Tabula Heroniana, give a reconstruction of 1,052 m (3,451 ft) in length and 64 m (210 ft) in width, excluding spectator ramparts. Werner Petermandl argues that the same evidence may support a length of four stadia, about 710.4 m (2,331 ft).

== Events ==
The first equestrian event added to the Olympic program was the four-horse chariot race in 680 BC. The horse race was added in 648 BC. Events included the tethrippon, a four-horse chariot race; the keles, a horse race; the synoris, a two-horse chariot race; the apene, a mule-cart race; the kalpe, a mare race; and races for foals.

In Olympic equestrian events, the owners of horses and chariots were treated as the competitors rather than the riders or charioteers. This rule allowed women to win Olympic events through ownership of horses or chariots.

Greek myth connected Olympia with a chariot race between Pelops and Oenomaus. Pausanias wrote that the front pediment of the Temple of Zeus showed the preparation for that race.

== Starting mechanism ==
The hippodrome used a starting mechanism, or aphesis, with stalls and barriers. Pausanias wrote that an altar stood near the center of the prow-shaped starting-place. A bronze eagle stood on the altar, and a bronze dolphin stood on a rod at the prow. The race starter operated the mechanism in the altar. The eagle rose, the dolphin fell, and the barriers were released in order until the horses were aligned at the prow.

Pausanias credited Cleoetas with the starting method and said that Aristeides added another device to the mechanism.

== Location and survey ==
The hippodrome was long thought to have been lost because the area described by Pausanias had been flooded by the Alfeios and covered with silt. In 2008, a team led by Norbert Müller, Christian Wacker and Reinhard Senff used geomagnetic mapping and ground-penetrating radar east of the sanctuary of Olympia. The team surveyed 10.5 hectares with geomagnetic mapping and 3.6 hectares with ground radar. The survey identified parallel anomalies, including ditches, walls or ramparts, over almost 200 m (660 ft). The researchers connected the anomalies with the hippodrome and placed the course parallel to the stadium, east of the sanctuary.
