= Geraki, Elis =

Geraki Γεράκι
- Community
- Location within Greece
- Coordinates: 37°48′N 21°24′E
- Country: Greece
- Administrative region: West Greece
- Regional unit: Elis
- Municipality: Ilida
- Municipal unit: Amaliada

Population (2021)
  - Community: 555
- Time zone: UTC+2 (EET)
  - Summer (DST): UTC+3 (EEST)
- Vehicle registration: ΗΑ

Geraki (Greek: Γεράκι) is a village and a community in the municipal unit of Amaliada, Elis, Greece. It is situated in low hills, 4 km east of Amaliada, 7 km northwest of Vounargo and about 14 km northwest of Pyrgos. The community includes the small village Analipsi.

== Population ==
Year	Village population	Community population
1981	664	-
1991	500	-
2001	583	716
2011	501	614
2021	454	555

== History ==
The first settlements in Geraki date from the middle of the 19th century, and the original inhabitants came from the Mani Peninsula in southern Peloponnese.

During the Second World War, Geraki was burned down by the Germans occupiers (in 1943) because it harboured a strong movement of resistance to the occupation. Only the school and the Orthodox church were saved from the fire. In the main square of the village can be found a monument to Dimitris Tsamis, who in 1943 helped to save the lives of 80 inhabitants of Geraki by refusing to denounce them to the occupiers. After the war, the village was entirely reconstructed thanks to the solidarity and cooperation of the inhabitants.

== Economy ==
Geraki's economy is based mainly on farming. The most common crops are grapes, olives, tomatoes, beans. Raisins and wine are also produced in Geraki. The village has two cafes, two grill houses and one mini-market, all located around the central square. Three olive presses specialised in the production of olive oils are also based in the village.

== Notable buildings ==
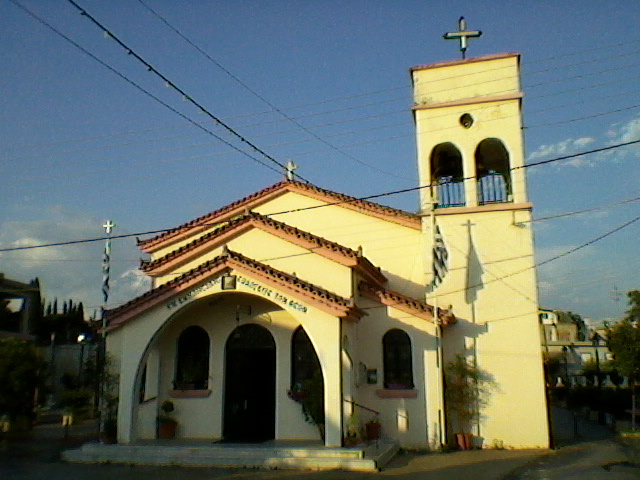
Orthodox church in Geraki.

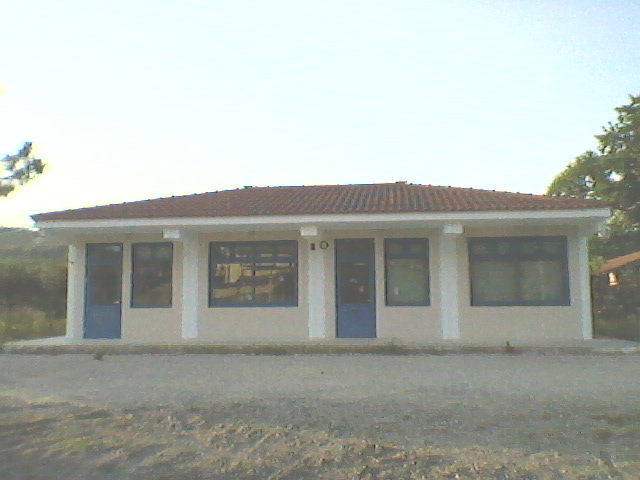
Village school in Geraki.

Geraki has an Orthodox church which is dedicated to the Saint Trinity (Aghia Triada).

The village also has its own school, faced by a huge olive tree and by a small playground.

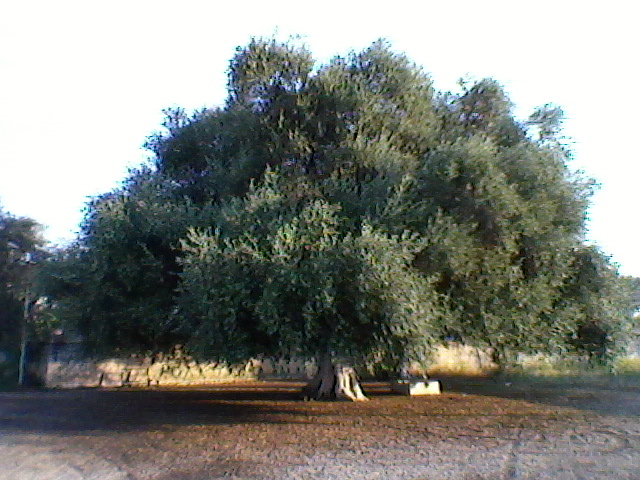
Olive tree fronting the village school in Geraki.

== See also ==
- List of settlements in Elis
