= Kryovrysi =

Kryovrisi may refer to several places in Greece:

- Kryovrysi, Elis, a village in the Elis regional unit
- Kryovrysi, Ioannina, a village in the Ioannina regional unit
- Kryovrysi, Kozani, a village in the Kozani regional unit
- Kryovrysi, Larissa, a village in the Larissa regional unit
- Kryovrysi, Laconia, a village in the Laconia regional unit
- Kryovrysi, Thesprotia, a village in the Thesprotia regional unit
