= Tragano =

Tragano Τραγανό
- Municipal unit
- Location within the regional unit

- Location within Greece
- Coordinates: 37°54′N 21°19′E
- Country: Greece
- Administrative region: West Greece
- Regional unit: Elis
- Municipality: Pineios

Area
  - Municipal unit: 41.475 km^{2} (16.014 sq mi)
- Elevation: 5 m (16 ft)

Population (2021)
  - Municipal unit: 4,276
  - Municipal unit density: 103.1/km^{2} (267.0/sq mi)
  - Community: 3,700
- Time zone: UTC+2 (EET)
  - Summer (DST): UTC+3 (EEST)
- Postal code: 270 57
- Area code: 26230
- Vehicle registration: ΗΑ

Tragano (Greek, Modern: Τραγανό, Ancient/Katharevousa: -on) is a town and a former municipality in Elis, West Greece, Greece. Since the 2011 local government reform it is part of the municipality Pineios, of which it is a municipal unit. The municipal unit has an area of 41.475 km^{2}. Tragano is situated in a flat, rural area, north of the river Pineios. It is 2 km east of Stafidokampos, 4 km east of Andravida, 3 km north of Agia Mavra, 5 km northwest of Avgeio and 8 km northeast of Gastouni. It is 2 km southeast of the Andravida Air Base.

== Subdivisions ==
The municipal unit Tragano is subdivided into the following communities:

- Tragano
- Agia Mavra
- Simiza

The community Tragano consists of the town Tragano and the small villages Markopoulo, Olga and Pigadi. Markopoulo is 1 km east of Tragano town centre. Olga is 3 km east of Tragano. Pigadi is 7 km east of Tragano.

== Historical population ==
Year	Community	Municipal unit
1981	-	2,502
1991	1,980	2,774
2001	2,688	3,361
2011	3,347	3,881
2021	3,700	4,276

== See also ==
- List of settlements in Elis
