= Roviata =

Roviata Ροβιάτα
- Community
- Location within Greece
- Coordinates: 37°49′N 21°18′E
- Country: Greece
- Administrative region: West Greece
- Regional unit: Elis
- Municipality: Ilida
- Municipal unit: Amaliada
- Elevation: 6 m (20 ft)

Population (2021)
  - Community: 332
- Time zone: UTC+2 (EET)
  - Summer (DST): UTC+3 (EEST)
- Postal code: 272 00
- Vehicle registration: ΗΑ

Roviata (Greek: Ροβιάτα) is a village and a community in the municipal unit of Amaliada in the northwestern part of Elis, Greece. It is located in the plains near the Ionian Sea, 1 km southeast of Savalia, 6 km northwest of Kardamas, 5 km west of Amaliada and 6 km southeast of Gastouni. The Greek National Road 9/E55 (Patras - Pyrgos) passes southwest of the village. The community includes the small villages Kasidiaris, Paralia and Romeika.

== Historical population ==
Year	Village population	Community population
1981	328	-
1991	317	-
2001	319	400
2011	281	345
2021	261	332

== See also ==
- List of settlements in Elis
