= Christos Laskaris =

Greek poet

Christos Laskaris (Greek: Χρίστος Λάσκαρης, 1931 – December 11, 2008) was a Greek poet.

Laskaris was born in the village of Chavari in Elis, but moved to Patras as a child. He studied at the Pedagogical Academy of Tripoli, but did not become a teacher; instead, he worked his entire career in the insurance division of the Patras city bus authority. He was awarded the Cavafy International Award in Cairo in 2007.

== Works ==
Year	Title	English title	Publisher	ISBN
-	Απόγευμα προς βράδυ	Morning Until Night	Gavriilidis	ISBN 960-336-214-X
-	Δωμάτιο για ένα	Bedroom For One	Gavriilidis	ISBN 978-0-00-336657-0 (2001)
1978	Ποιήματα	Poems	Gavriilidis	ISBN 960-336-056-2
1982	Να εμποδίσεις τις σκιές	-	Diagonios	-
1986	Να τελειώνουμε	I Will Complete	Diagonios	OCLC 29412601
1991	Σύντομο βιογραφικό	-	Diagonios	OCLC 34253228
1995	Ποιήματα	Poems	Bilieto	ISBN 960-85367-3-1
1997	Τέλος προγράμματος	Program Over	Bilieto	ISBN 960-85367-9-0
