= Stafidokampos =

Stafidokampos Σταφιδόκαμπος
- Community
- Location within Greece
- Coordinates: 37°53.6′N 21°17.6′E
- Country: Greece
- Administrative region: West Greece
- Regional unit: Elis
- Municipality: Andravida-Kyllini
- Municipal unit: Andravida

Population (2021)
  - Community: 290
- Time zone: UTC+2 (EET)
  - Summer (DST): UTC+3 (EEST)
- Vehicle registration: ΗΑ

Stafidokampos (Greek: Σταφιδόκαμπος) is a village in the municipal unit of Andravida, Elis, Greece. It is situated in a flat rural area, 2 km southeast of the centre of Andravida, 2 km west of Tragano, 2 km north of the river Pineios and 28 km northwest of Pyrgos. The Andravida Air Base is 2 km to the north.

== Historical population ==
Year	Population
1981	206
1991	341
2001	345
2011	334
2021	290
