= Agia Mavra, Elis =

Agia Mavra Άγια Μάυρα
- Community
- Location within Greece
- Coordinates: 37°54′N 21°23′E
- Country: Greece
- Administrative region: West Greece
- Regional unit: Elis
- Municipality: Pineios
- Municipal unit: Tragano
- Elevation: 20 m (66 ft)

Population (2021)
  - Community: 497
- Time zone: UTC+2 (EET)
  - Summer (DST): UTC+3 (EEST)
- Postal code: 273 00
- Area code: 26230
- Vehicle registration: ΗΑ

Agia Mavra (Greek: Άγια Μάυρα) is a village in the municipal unit of Tragano, Elis, Greece. It is situated in a flat, rural area, on the left bank of the river Pineios. It is 3km South of Tragano, 4km East of Kavasila, 2km Northwest of Roupaki, 2km Northeast of Koroivos, and 6km Northeast of Gastouni.

== Population ==
Year	Population
1981	346
1991	376
2001	550
2011	468
2021	497

== See also ==
- List of settlements in Elis
