= Afgeio =

Avgeio Αυγείο
- Community
- Location within Greece
- Coordinates: 37°52′N 21°22′E
- Country: Greece
- Administrative region: West Greece
- Regional unit: Elis
- Municipality: Ilida
- Municipal unit: Amaliada
- Elevation: 8 m (26 ft)

Population (2021)
  - Community: 235
- Time zone: UTC+2 (EET)
  - Summer (DST): UTC+3 (EEST)
- Postal code: 273 00
- Area code: 26220
- Vehicle registration: ΗΑ

Avgeio (Greek: Αυγείο, before 1955: Μπουχιώτη - Bouchioti) is a village in the northern part of the municipal unit of Amaliada, Elis, Greece. It is situated in a plain near the ancient city of Elis, 1 km southwest of Kalyvia, 2 km northeast of Sosti and 9 km north of Amaliada.

== Population ==
Year	Population
1981	446
1991	364
2001	429
2011	325
2021	235

== See also ==
- List of settlements in Elis
