= Ephyra (Elis) =

Coordinates: 37°51′N 21°31′E

Ephyra (Ancient Greek: Ἐφύρη, Ἔφυρα, Ἐφύρα, or Εφύρα) was town of ancient Elis, situated upon the river Selleeis, and the ancient capital of Augeias, whom Heracles conquered. Homer, in the Catalogue of Ships and elsewhere in the Iliad, mentions Ephyra and writers have debated which Ephyra is meant.

Strabo describes Ephyra as distant 120 stadia from Elis, on the road to Lasion, and says that on its site or near it was built the town of Oenoe or Boeonoa. Stephanus of Byzantium also speaks of an Ephyra between Pylos and Elis, Pylos being the town at the junction of the Ladon and the Peneius. From these two accounts there can be little doubt that the Ladon, the chief tributary of the Peneius, is the Selleeis, which Strabo describes as rising in Mount Pholoë.

Ephyra's site is tentatively located within the bounds of modern Efyra.
