= Kavasila =

Kavasila (Greek: Καβάσιλα) may refer to the following places in Greece:

- Kavasila, Attica, a village in the Athens metropolitan area (Attica)
- Kavasila, Elis, a village in Elis
- Kavasila, Imathia, a village in Imathia
- Kavasila, Ioannina, a village in northern Ioannina regional unit
