= Markopoulos =

Markopoulos (Greek: Μαρκόπουλος) is a Greek surname, which means son of Mark. The female version of the name is Markopoulou. Notable examples include:

== Men ==
- Evan Markopoulos (born 1994), American professional wrestler
- Giorgos Markopoulos (born 1951), Greek poet
- Gregory Markopoulos (1928–1992), American filmmaker
- John Markopoulos (1951–2004), Greek businessman
- Soulis Markopoulos (born 1949), Greek basketball coach
- Xenofon Markopoulos (1921–1992), Greek footballer
- Yannis Markopoulos (1939–2023), Greek composer

== Women ==
- Athina Markopoulou, Greek-American engineer
- Fotini Markopoulou-Kalamara (born 1971), Greek physicist

== See also ==
- Harry Markopolos
- Limin Markopoulou
- Markopoulo (disambiguation)
