= OSE class AA.6001 =

OSE class AA.6001 (ex. SPAP's 3ΑΚ1000.01)
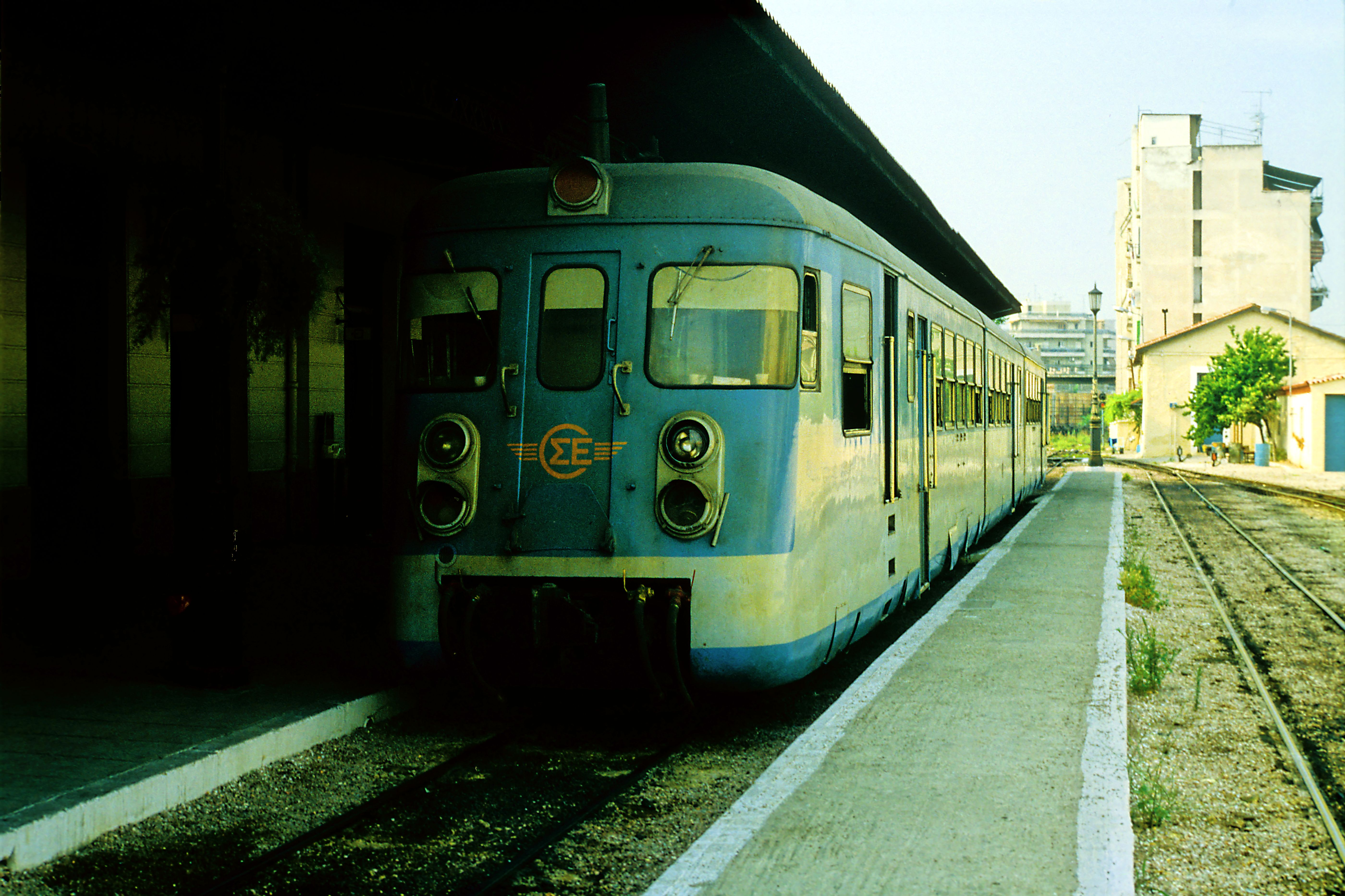
- Class 6001 trainset at Peloponnese Station, Athens (1992)
Type and origin
- Power type: Diesel-Hydraulic
- Builder: Esslingen -Ferrostaal - Mercedes
- Build date: 1958
- Total produced: 7
Specifications
- Gauge: Metric (1 m)
- Power supply: Diesel oil
- Transmission: Hydraulic
Performance figures
- Maximum speed: 100km/h
- Power output: 736kW
Career
- Operators: SPAP (1958–1962), SEK (1962–1971), OSE (1971–1991)
- Numbers: 6001–6007 (trainsets), 0021–0027 (trailer coaches)

Class AA.6001, was an old DMU class with 3 coaches, which was part of the Hellenic Railway Organization (OSE)'s rolling stock. They were built in 1958 by Esslingen in cooperation with Ferrostaal in West Germany as class 3ΑΚ1000.01, and put into service by OSE in 1971, when it was founded (Formerly used for different companies.) Usually, they were coupled with a trailer coach. In total, 21 coaches were produced, consisting, by three, 7 trainsets with 3 coaches, numbered 6001 to 6007, and 7 more trailer coaches numbered 0021 to 0027 were also built.

They could fit up to 84 passengers, 31 in 1st class and 52 in 2nd class, and also had 11 folding seats, while the trailer coaches had folding seats and 54 normal seats. The trains were powered by two Mercedes MB 836 Ββ/6 diesel engines, with combined power of 736 kW and could reach speeds up to 100 km/h. They also had a bar.

== History ==
The trainsets were ordered by Piraeus-Athens-Peloponnese railways (SPAP) in 1958, possibly to replace the steam locomotives used then. It was SPAP's final act. When in 1962, SPAP and the rest of railway companies were merged into Hellenic State Railways (SEK), they were moved there, and since 1971, they are owned by OSE.

At first, they were used on Intercity lines across the network (Athens-Τripolis-Kalamata, Athens-Patras-Olympia and Athens-Patras-Kyparissia, but eventually, they were moved to Patras-Kyparissia and Kavasila-Kyllini local trains. They were withdrawn when MAN-1 and MAN-4 trainsets were delivered in 1991, but the trailer coaches were stayed until recently in operational condition, as passenger coaches at several local trains.
