= Eupolemos of Elis =

Ancient Greek athlete

- Εὐπόλεμος Ἠλεῖος
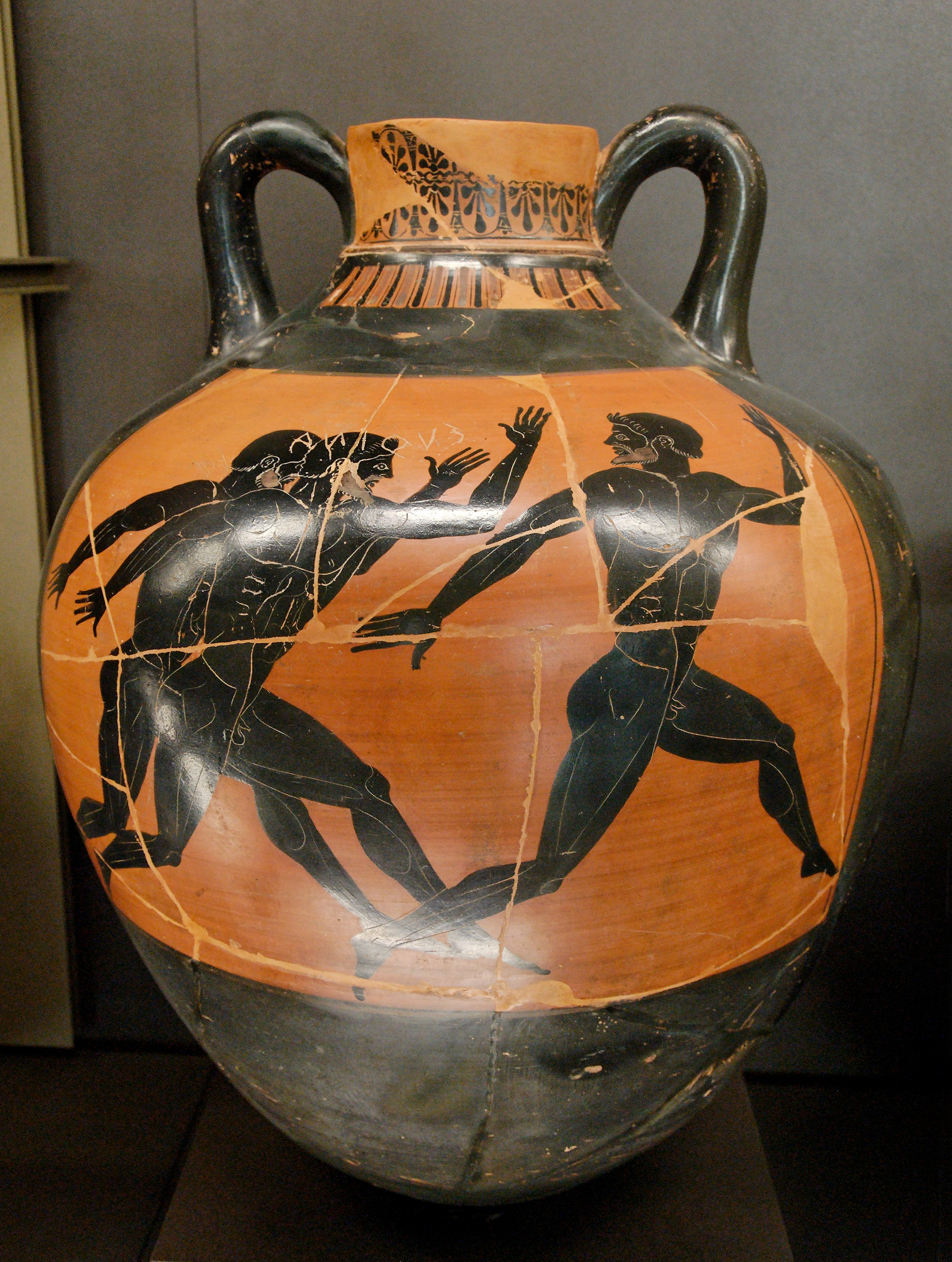
- Stadion runners Panathenaic black-figure amphora, circa 500 BC; Cleophrades painter (Louvre G65)
- Born: Elis
- Occupations: Athlete, Running
- Awards: Winner of the Stadion race (396 BC); Pythian games winner; Nemean games winner

Eupolemos of Elis (Ancient Greek: Εὐπόλεμος Ἠλεῖος) or Eupolis of Elis (Note: Diodorus Siculus used this spelling.) was an ancient Greek athlete from the city of Elis. He won several pentathlons at the Panhellenic Games.

His victory in the stadion at the XCVI Olympic Games, in 396 BC, was contested by the second-place finisher, Leon of Ambracia, who questioned the impartiality of the judges. This is an almost unique event in ancient olympic history. At the end of the appeal procedure initiated by Leon, the two judges who had decided in favor of Eupolemos were fined, but the victory remained his.

== Disputed Olympic victory ==
Eupolemos of Elis won the stadium-length (approx. 192 m) foot race at the XCVI Olympic Games in 396 BC. However, as the race was very close, his victory was contested by the runner-up, Leon of Ambracia.

Three referees, the Hellanodikai, were in charge of supervising the running events, a difficult task, (Note: From the 95th Games, in 400 BC, the number of hellanodikai had been increased, perhaps to cope with refereeing difficulties. (Pausanias (1992). Les Belles Lettres (ed.). Description de la Grèce [Description of Greece] (in French). Vol. 1. Paris: . pp. 5, 9. ISBN 2-251-00429-7. & Crowther (1997), p. 153)) as there were between twenty or so men spread over a width of more than 20 meters at the finish of a sprint of just under 200 meters. The month of compulsory training in Olympia prior to the Games, supervised by the Hellanodikai, was also intended to enable them to distinguish between the athletes. However, with the dust raised by the race, hesitation remained a possibility. Nevertheless, the numerous spectators could also judge the finish, and the sources do not mention any protests from the spectators when the Hellanodikai announced Eupolemos' victory. Nevertheless, Eupolemos was racing on his home turf, while Leon was arriving from the distant city of Ambracia.

The Games were organized by the city of Elis, and the referees all hailed from there. Two of the three judges in the footrace had awarded victory to Eupolemos, their compatriot; the third had chosen Leon of Ambracia. The latter appealed to the olympic council, (Note: Little is known about this entity, although it is present in numerous inscriptions. This council may have been composed of former hellanodikai or members of the main Elis families. The appeals procedure is not known either. (Crowther (1997), p. 153)) accusing the judges of being financially corrupt. The victory, however, went to Eupolemos. Indeed, it is his statue, made by Daedalus of Sicyone, that Pausanias described on the Altis.

This reconsideration of the Hellanodikai was an anomaly in the history of the Olympic Games. Indeed, ancient authors tended to praise their qualities and impartiality. The two judges who decided in favor of Eupolemos were nevertheless fined by the olympic council, the amount of which is unknown. Fines imposed on athletes were often very high; those imposed on referees may also have been. It is possible that the sum was paid to Léon d'Ambracie as compensation. This verdict by the council was surprising, but it is highly probable that they were unable to reverse a decision by the Hellanodikai, primarily for religious reasons, since the winners were considered to have been chosen by the gods.

Leo of Ambracia's accusation of corruption was equally problematic. Had it been true, Eupolemos of Elis would also have been fined, but this does not appear to have been the case. However, it is still possible that someone else paid the judges to decide in Eupolemos' favor. It's also possible that they favored their compatriot, either consciously or unconsciously: knowing Eupolemos better than the foreign riders, they might have believed, in good faith, that he would come in first. Finally, there's one last possibility: as the Hellanodikai were chosen by lot from among the citizens of Elis, the referees of the XCVI Games footrace may have been incompetent.

== Pentathlete ==
Eupolemos of Elis also won the pentathlon twice at the Pythian Games (probably in 398 and 394 BC) and once at the Nemean Games (probably in 397 BC).

== Bibliography ==
=== Ancient sources ===
- Sextus Julius Africanus, Olympiade, 96
- Siculus, Diodorus (1993). Les Belles Lettres (ed.). Bibliothèque historique [Bibliotheca historica] (in French). Vol. 1. Paris: . ISBN 2-251-00435-1.
- Eusebius. Chronicon. pp. 70–825, book I.
- Pausanias (1992). Les Belles Lettres (ed.). Description de la Grèce [Description of Greece] (in French). Vol. 1. Paris: . ISBN 2-251-00429-7.
- Oxyrhynchus Papyri, XXIII 2381.

=== Other sources ===
- Christesen, Paul (2007). Cambridge University Press (ed.). Olympic Victor Lists and Ancient Greek History. New York: . ISBN 978-0-521-86634-7.
- Crowther, Nigel B. (1997). "'Sed quis custodiet ipsos custodes?' The impartiality of the Olympic judges and the case of Leon of Ambracia". Nikephoros (10): 149–160.
- Golden, Mark (2004). Routledge (ed.). Sport in the Ancient World from A to Z. London: Routledge. ISBN 0-415-24881-7.
- Harris, Harold Arthur (1964). Hutchinson (ed.). Greek athletes and athletics. London: Hutchinson.
- Matthews, Victor (2007). "Olympic Losers: Why Athletes Who Did Not Win at Olympia Are Remembered". In Schaus, G. P.; Wenn, S. R. (eds.). Onward to the Olympics: Historical Perspectives on the Olympic Games. Waterloo, Ontario: Wilfrid Laurier University Press. pp. 81–93. ISBN 978-0889205055.
- Matz, David (1991). McFarland & Company (ed.). Greek and Roman Sport: A Dictionary of Athletes and Events from the Eighth Century B. C. to the Third Century A. D. Jefferson and London: McFarland. ISBN 0-89950-558-9.
- Moretti, Luigi (1959). "Olympionikai, i vincitori negli antichi agoni olimpici" [Olympionikai, the winners in the ancient Olympic arenas]. Atti della Accademia Nazionale dei Lincei (in Italian). VIII: 55–199.
- Romano, David Gilman (2007). "Judges and Judging at the Ancient Olympic Games". In Schaus, G. P.; Wenn, S. R. (eds.). Onward to the Olympics: Historical Perspectives on the Olympic Games. Waterloo, Ontario: Wilfrid Laurier University Press. pp. 95–113. ISBN 978-0889205055.
- Zarnowski, Frank (2013). McFarland & Company (ed.). The Pentathlon of the Ancient World. Jefferson and London: McFarland. ISBN 978-0-7864-6783-9.

Preceded by Minon of Athens	Eupolemos of Elis; 396 BC; With: Winner of the Stadion race	Succeeded by Terinaeus of Élis
