= Petra (Elis) =

Former deme of ancient Elis, near Elis

Petra (Ancient Greek: Πέτρα) was an ancient settlement belonging to ancient Elis. Pausanias writes that it was in the immediate neighbourhood of Elis and contained the tomb of the philosopher Pyrrho. Its precise location is unknown.
