= Oenoe (Elis) =

Oenoe or Oenoë or Oinoe (Ancient Greek: Οἰνόη), also known as Boeonoa, was a town of ancient Elis. It was located near Ephyra.
