= Markopoulo =

Markopoulo (Greek: Μαρκόπουλο) may refer to places in Greece:

- Markopoulo Mesogaias, a suburban town of Athens
- Markopoulo, Elis, a small village in the municipal unit of Tragano, Elis
- Markopoulo, Kefalonia, a village in the southeastern part of the island of Kefalonia
- Markopoulo Oropou, a commune in the northeastern part of Athens near Oropos
- Limin Markopoulou, or Porto Rafti, the port of Markopoulo Mesogaias
