= Kalo Paidi =

Coordinates: 37°50′N 21°35′E

Kalo Paidi (Καλό Παιδί) is a village in the municipality of Ilida. It is located in Elis in western Greece. It's built on a small hill with a height of 280m.

Kalo Paidi was established in the year 1800 (in the war by Turkey) by 4 shepherds that were trying to live in this area. The pasha of this area gave the name Kalo Paidi because he believed that the 4 shepherds were "good children". Over time, more people arrived in Kalo Paidi and today, 100 people live there.
