= Agrapidochori =

Agrapidochori Αγραπιδοχώρι
- Community
- Location within Greece
- Coordinates: 37°53′49″N 21°31′41″E
- Country: Greece
- Administrative region: West Greece
- Regional unit: Elis
- Municipality: Ilida
- Municipal unit: Pineia

Population (2021)
  - Community: 135
- Time zone: UTC+2 (EET)
  - Summer (DST): UTC+3 (EEST)

Agrapidochori is a settlement in the West side of Elis, Peloponnese, Greece. Nativity of Mary Orthodox Church can be found in Agrapidochori settlement.

== See also ==
- List of settlements in Elis
