= Thalamae (Elis) =

Thalamae or Thalamai (Ancient Greek: Θαλάμαι) was a town of ancient Elis, situated above Pylus on the frontiers of Achaea, and in the rocky recesses of Mount Scollis. It was here that the Eleians took refuge with their property and flocks, when their country was invaded by Philip V of Macedon in 219 BCE.

Its site is unlocated.
