= Ephyra (Sicyonia) =

Ephyra (Ancient Greek: Ἐφύρη) was a village of Sicyonia, in the north of the Peloponnese, mentioned by Strabo, along with the river Selleeis (distinct from the river Selleeis in Elis), as situated near Sicyon. Ludwig Ross conjectures that some ruins situated upon a hill about 20 minutes southeast of Suli represent the Sicyonian Ephyra, but modern writers say it is unlocated.
