= Kryovrysi, Elis =

Kryovrysi Κρυόβρυση
- Community
- Location within Greece
- Coordinates: 37°55′N 21°48′E
- Country: Greece
- Administrative region: West Greece
- Regional unit: Elis
- Municipality: Archaia Olympia
- Municipal unit: Lasiona

Population (2021)
  - Community: 210
- Time zone: UTC+2 (EET)
  - Summer (DST): UTC+3 (EEST)

Kryovrysi (Greek: Κρυόβρυση meaning "cold spring", before 1928: Βερβενή - Verveni) is a mountain village and a community in the municipal unit of Lasiona, Olympia, Elis, Greece. The community consists of the villages Kryovrysi and Kalyvia. It is situated in the southwestern foothills of Mount Erymanthos, at 960 m elevation. It is 4 km west of Agrampela, 5 km southeast of Kalentzi, 7 km north of Lampeia and 15 km northeast of Antroni. The source of the river Pineios is near Kryovrysi. Downstream from Kryovrysi, near the river bed of the Pineios, is the cave Drakotrypa (also Diakotrypa).

== Population ==
Year	Village population	Community population
1981	410	-
1991	397	-
2001	544	622
2011	151	187
2021	175	210

== See also ==
- List of settlements in Elis
