= Agia Triada, Elis =

Agia Triada Αγία Τριάδα
- Community
- Location within Greece
- Coordinates: 37°51.7′N 21°38.8′E
- Country: Greece
- Administrative region: West Greece
- Regional unit: Elis
- Municipality: Archaia Olympia
- Municipal unit: Lasiona
- Elevation: 460 m (1,510 ft)

Population (2021)
  - Community: 220
- Time zone: UTC+2 (EET)
  - Summer (DST): UTC+3 (EEST)
- Postal code: 270 69
- Area code: 026220

Agia Triada (Greek: Αγία Τριάδα, meaning the Holy Trinity) is a village in the northern part of the municipal unit of Lasiona, Olympia, Elis, Greece. It is situated near the river Pineios, which forms the border with Achaea here. It is located 7 km northwest of Antroni, 7 km east of Simopoulo, 9 km south of Stavrodromi and 24 km north of Olympia. The Greek National Road 33 (Patras - Tripoli) runs through the village.

== Historical population ==
Year	Population
1981	244
1991	299
2001	356
2011	217
2021	220

== See also ==
- List of settlements in Elis
