= Simopoulo =

Simopoulo Σιμόπουλο
- Community
- Location within Greece
- Coordinates: 37°51′N 21°34′E
- Country: Greece
- Administrative region: West Greece
- Regional unit: Elis
- Municipality: Ilida
- Municipal unit: Pineia

Population (2021)
  - Community: 305
- Time zone: UTC+2 (EET)
  - Summer (DST): UTC+3 (EEST)
- Vehicle registration: ΗΑ

Simopoulo (Greek: Σιμόπουλο) is a village and a community in the municipal unit of Pineia, Elis, Greece. Since the 2011 local government reform, it is part of the municipality Ilida. Simopoulo was the seat of the former municipality Pineia. It is situated in the sparsely populated hills of northern Elis. It is 5 km east of Efyra, 7 km west of Agia Triada and 23 km northeast of Pyrgos. The community includes the village Agios Nikolaos.

== Population ==
Year	Village	Community
1981	-	495
1991	480	-
2001	492	527
2011	369	390
2021	290	305
