= Kalyvia, Heraklion =

Regional village

Kalyvia Καλύβια
- Community
- Location within Greece
- Coordinates: 35°03′29″N 25°13′41″E
- Country: Greece
- Administrative region: Crete
- Regional unit: Heraklion
- Municipality: Archanes-Asterousia
- Municipal unit: Asterousia

Population (2021)
  - Community: 250
- Time zone: UTC+2 (EET)
  - Summer (DST): UTC+3 (EEST)

Kalyvia (Greek: Καλύβια, "huts") is a village in the Heraklion regional unit on southern Crete in Greece. The local area was important in the Minoan era, as manifested by the extensive ruins of nearby Phaistos, a major palatial settlement of the Bronze Age.

== See also ==
- Phaistos
- Hagia Triada
