= Gavriilidis =

Gavriilidis (Greek: Γαβριηλίδης) is a Greek surname, derived from the given name Gabriel. Notable people with the surname include:

- Giorgos Gavriilidis (1908–1982), Greek actor
- Ioannis Gavriilidis (born 1982), Greek Olympic diver
- Vlasis Gavriilidis (1848–1920), Greek journalist
