= Hagia Triada Church, Ayvalık =

Church in Ayvalık, Turkey

Coordinates: 39.31359°N 26.69518°E

Hagia Triada (Greek: Ἁγία Τριάδα, Turkish: Aya Triada Kilisesi), meaning Holy Trinity, was a Greek Orthodox church in Ayvalık, Turkey. After the Greco-Turkish population exchange in 1922, it has been converted into a mosque and is now a museum.

== History ==
It was built in 1846 by the Greek population of the city. After the 1923 population exchange between Greece and Turkey, the church was converted into a mosque and was called Biberli Cami.

Between 1953 and 1984, the building was used as a tobacco warehouse for the Turkish government tobacco and alcoholic beverage company, Tekel. After the 1984 law that aimed to preserve the cultural heritage sites, the building was left unoccupied.

In 2004, the building was assigned to the Turkish Culture Ministry. The ministry asked Ayvalık Municipality to turn it into a cultural center, but this didn't happen. In 2020, the regional cultural and natural heritage preservation board granted approval to the restoration of the Hagia Triada Church and the conversion into a cultural museum.

== Building ==
Hagia Triada covers an area of 400 Square metre.

The church was a basilica with three naves and a gallery floor above the narthex. Stone masonry and timber-frame structure was used together in the building. Main outer walls and narthex were constructed with the stone masonry while the roof and gallery floor were constructed with the timber frame. The roof is carried by monolithic timber columns which divide the naves and it is covered by ornamented timber ceilings.

It has a single apse, five columns placed between the central and side aisles and circular-formed stairs leading to the narthex. In the past it had a court. In addition, it had a bell tower that has been demolished, most probably during the 1944 earthquake, and there is no sign of the bell as well.

According to the researchers, the Hagia Triada Church reflects the details of craftsmanship, timber construction system and techniques, material usage and artistic features of its period.

Because of the 1984 law, the building was left unoccupied. Due to this it got damaged and vandalized. The damages were done by people and nature. For example, due to an unrepaired damage on the roof that let the rain water inside, the wooden ceilings first faced damage and as a result, the interior became damaged as well.
