= Efyra =

Efyra Εφύρα
- Community
- Location within Greece
- Coordinates: 37°51′N 21°31′E
- Country: Greece
- Administrative region: West Greece
- Regional unit: Elis
- Municipality: Ilida
- Municipal unit: Pineia

Area
  - Community: 12 km^{2} (4.6 sq mi)
- Elevation: 120 m (390 ft)

Population (2021)
  - Community: 267
  - Density: 22/km^{2} (58/sq mi)
- Time zone: UTC+2 (EET)
  - Summer (DST): UTC+3 (EEST)
- Postal code: 270 69
- Area code: 26220
- Vehicle registration: ΗΑ

Efyra (Greek: Εφύρα) is a village and a community in the western part of Pineia municipal unit, Elis, Greece. It lies at an altitude of 121 metres, and covers an area of 12 km², of which 55% is arable and 20% is forest. It is situated southeast of the Pineios reservoir, and west of the river Pineakos Ladonas, which also flows into the Pineios reservoir. Efyra has a church dedicated to St. George. The community includes the village Pirio. Efyra is 2 km southeast of Kampos, 5 km west of Simopoulo and 21 km northeast of Pyrgos.

== History ==
Ephyra was a city of Ancient Elis, located on the river Selleeis (the present Pineakos Ladonas), and on the road to Lasion. Ephyra is mentioned by Homer as the home of the mother of Tlepolemus (Iliad) and as the place from where Telemachus brought poison (Odyssey).

== Historical population ==
Year	Population
1981	381
1991	441
2001	374
2011	268
2021	267

== See also ==
- List of settlements in Elis
