= Ephyra (Arcadia) =

Ephyra (Ancient Greek: Ἔφυρα) was a town of ancient Arcadia mentioned by Stephanus of Byzantium.

Its site is unlocated.
