= Ephyra (Aetolia) =

Ephyra (Ancient Greek: Ἐφύρη) was a town of the Agraei in ancient Aetolia. Its site is unlocated.
