= Kastro-Kyllini =

Former municipality in Elis, Greece

Kastro-Kyllini Κάστρο-Κυλλήνη
- Municipal unit
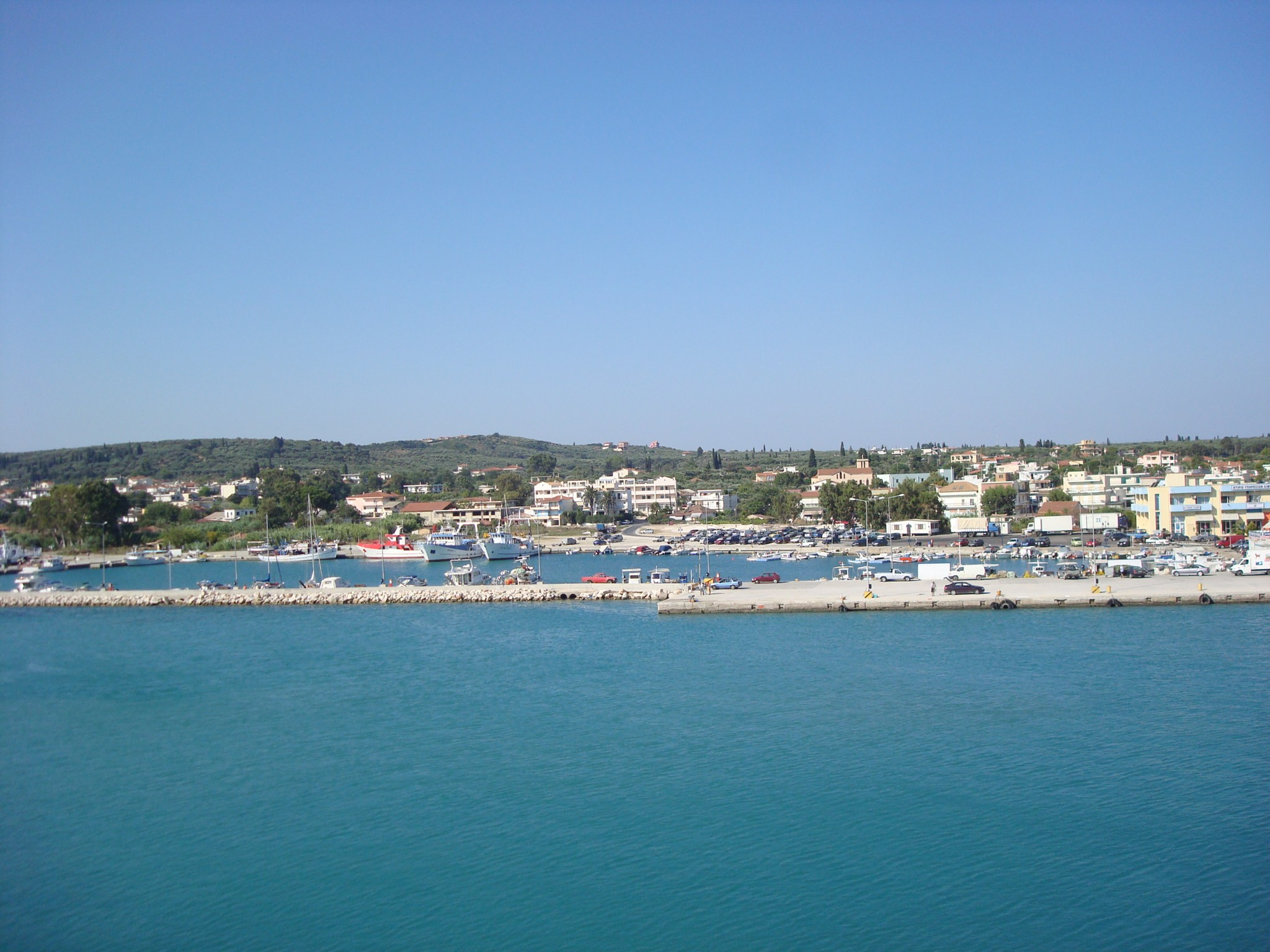

- Location within the regional unit

- Location within Greece
- Coordinates: 37°56′N 21°9′E
- Country: Greece
- Administrative region: West Greece
- Regional unit: Elis
- Municipality: Andravida-Kyllini

Area
  - Municipal unit: 49.322 km^{2} (19.043 sq mi)
- Elevation: 20 m (66 ft)

Population (2021)
  - Municipal unit: 3,272
  - Municipal unit density: 66.34/km^{2} (171.8/sq mi)
- Time zone: UTC+2 (EET)
  - Summer (DST): UTC+3 (EEST)
- Postal code: 270 68, 270 50
- Area code: 26230
- Vehicle registration: ΗΑ

Kastro-Kyllini (Greek: Κάστρο-Κυλλήνη) is a former municipality in Elis, West Greece, Greece. Since the 2011 local government reform it is part of the municipality Andravida-Kyllini, of which it is a municipal unit. The municipal unit has an area of 49.322 km^{2}. The population was 3,272 in 2021. The municipality Kastro-Kyllini was created in 1999 as part of the Kapodistrias reform from the formerly independent communities Kyllini, Kato Panagia, Kastro and Neochori, that became municipal districts. After the 2011 Kallikratis reform, these municipal districts became (dependent) communities. Its seat of administration was the small port town of Kyllini.

== Geography ==
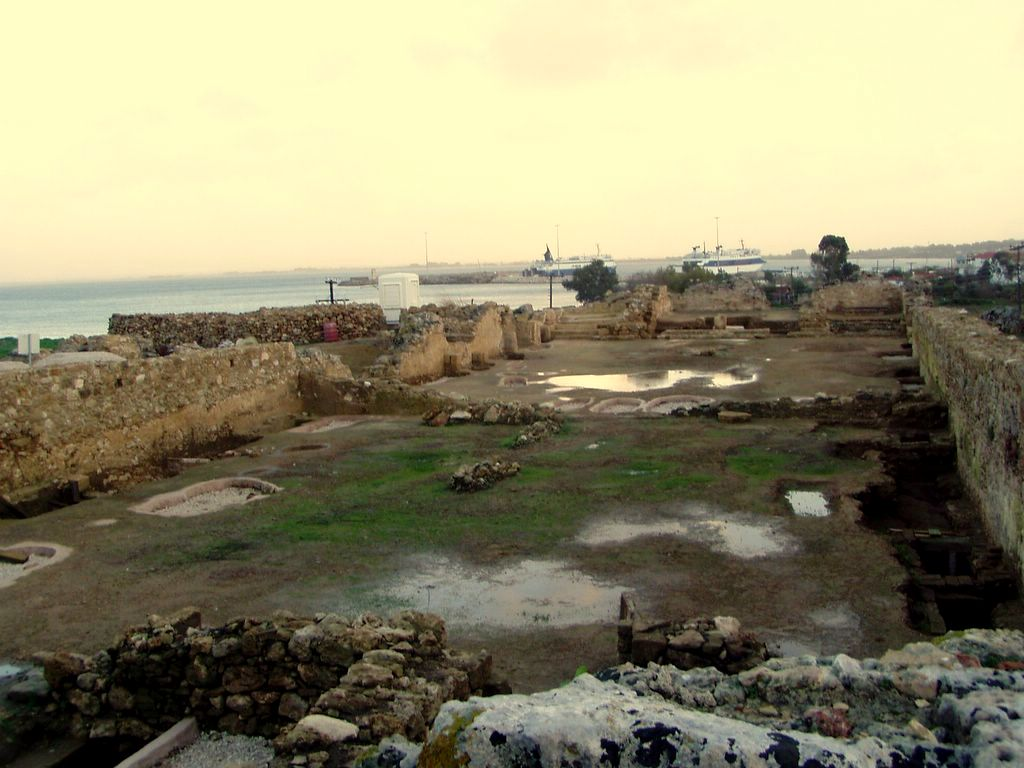
The ruins of the Glarentza fortress undergoing excavation and reconstruction.

Kastro-Kyllini is situated in the westernmost part of Elis and the Peloponnese, 12 kilometres (7 miles) west of Andravida and about 40 kilometres (25 miles) northwest of Pyrgos. It covers the northern part of the Kyllini peninsula, which juts into the Ionian Sea. The peninsula is covered with hills, but the area to the east of the peninsula is very flat. The Crusader fortress of Chlemoutsi is situated on the highest point of the peninsula, about 220 metres (722 feet) above sea level. Between the northernmost point, Cape Kyllini, and the town Kyllini the ruins of the medieval town of Glarentza have been excavated. There are forests and olive groves in the hills. Agriculture is the dominant land use in the plains.

There are several popular beaches on the coast. The thermal springs of Kyllini (Loutra Kyllinis) are the largest beach facility in the western Peloponnese. There is a monastery, the Monastery of Blachernae, southeast of Kato Panagia. The small island Kafkalida, near Cape Kyllini, is uninhabited. It carries a lighthouse.

=== Transportation ===
There were two railway lines in Kastro-Kyllini. The Kavasila – Vartholomio – Kyllini railway branched off the Patras – Pyrgos railway at Kavasila, and ran to Kyllini via Vartholomio. A branch line ran from Vartholomio to Loutra Kyllinis. Both lines have been abandoned. Several secondary roads connect the villages.

== Subdivisions ==
The municipal unit Kastro-Kyllini is subdivided into the following communities (constituent villages in brackets):

Community	Population 1981	Population 1991	Population 2001	Population 2011	Population 2021	Elevation (m)
Kyllini: Kylllini; Kafkalida	---	952	1,079	631	534	0-10
Kato Panagia: Kato Panagia; Ikaros; Moni Vlachernon	1,123	1,266	1,313	1,149	1,110	0-25
Neochori: Neochori; Vytinaiika	1,015	1,323	1,164	753	810	5-7
Kastro: Kastro; Analipsi; Kalamia; Karavaki; Loutra Kyllinis; Psili Rachi	244	857	930	1,089	818	110

=== Kato Panagia ===
The community of Kato Panagia (Greek: Κάτω Παναγιά) consists of the villages Kato Panagia, Ikaros and Moni Vlachernon. The village Kato Panagia is directly adjacent to Kyllini, on the road to Lechaina. The village Ikaros is 3 kilometres (2 miles) further east, also on the coast. Refugees from Asia Minor settled in Kato Panagia as a result of the Greco-Turkish War (1919–1922).

=== Kastro ===
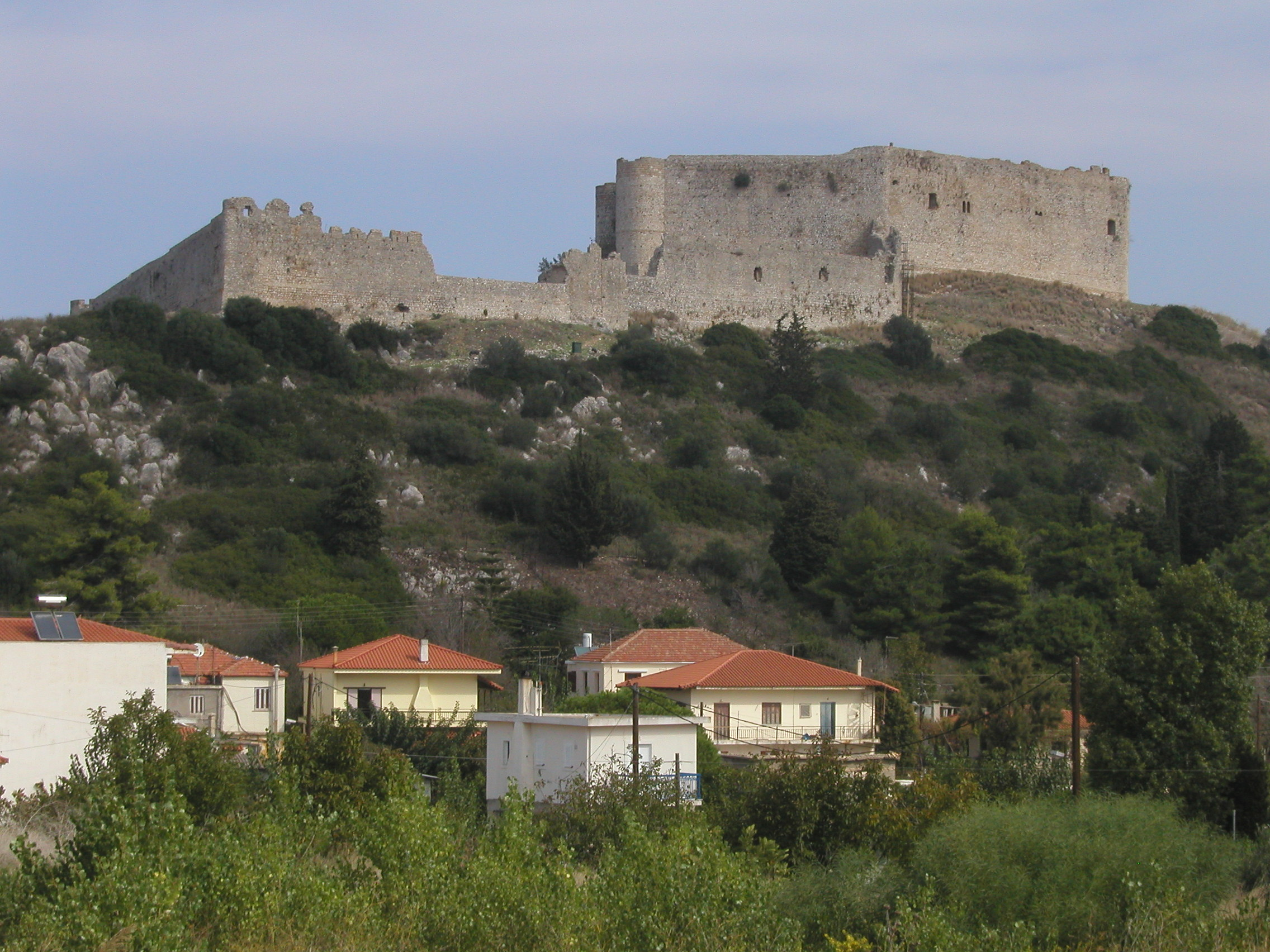
Chlemoutsi Castle

The community of Kastro (Greek: Κάστρο) consists of the town Kastro and the small villages Analipsi, Kalamia, Karavaki, Loutra Kyllinis and Psili Rachi. Kastro is 5 km (3 mi) south of Kyllini and 7 km (4 mi) northwest of Vartholomio. It is situated in the hills, and is dominated by the Chlemoutsi fortress. The name Kastro means "castle", and refers to Chlemoutsi. The fortress was built by prince Geoffrey I Villehardouin of the Principality of Achaea in 1220-1223, who called it Clairmont (from which Chlemoutsi is a derivation ). After the decline of the Principality the castle gradually lost its importance. Today it is as a monument and is sometimes used for concerts.

The thermal springs of Kyllini (Loutra Kyllinis) are 4 km (2 mi) southwest of Kastro, near the coast. It is a beach resort, surrounded by forests. The most famous baths also offers inhalation therapy, said to assist in asthma and skin problems. It is situated next to Roman ruins.

=== Neochori ===
The community of Neochori (Greek: Νεοχώρι) consists of the villages Neochori and Vytinaiika. Neochori is on the road from Kyllini to Lechaina, 6 km (4 mi) southeast of Kyllini and 6 km (4 mi) southwest of Lechaina. It is 3 km (2 mi) southwest of Myrsini and 3 km (2 mi) north of Machos. Neochori is in a flat, rural area.
