= Vartholomio =

Vartholomio Βαρθολομιό
- Municipal unit
- Location within the regional unit

- Location within Greece
- Coordinates: 37°52′N 21°12′E
- Country: Greece
- Administrative region: West Greece
- Regional unit: Elis
- Municipality: Pineios

Area
  - Municipal unit: 60.696 km^{2} (23.435 sq mi)
- Elevation: 23 m (75 ft)

Population (2021)
  - Municipal unit: 6,145
  - Municipal unit density: 101.2/km^{2} (262.2/sq mi)
  - Community: 4,478
- Time zone: UTC+2 (EET)
  - Summer (DST): UTC+3 (EEST)
- Postal code: 270 50
- Area code: 26230
- Vehicle registration: ΗΑ
- Website: www.vartholomio.gr

Vartholomio (Greek: Βαρθολομιό) is a town and a former municipality in Elis, West Greece, Greece. Since the 2011 local government reform it is part of the municipality Pineios, of which it is a municipal unit. The municipal unit has an area of 60.696 km^{2}. The municipal unit covers the southern part of the hilly Kyllini peninsula, and the plains to the southeast. The town Vartholomio is in the plains, on the right bank of the river Pineios, which flows into the Ionian Sea south of the town.

The town was at the junction of two railway lines, one from Kavasila to Kyllini, and the branch Vartholomio–Loutra Kyllinis railway line. Both railways have been dismantled. Vartholomio is 1 km northwest of Kalyvia Myrtountion, 4 km west of Gastouni, 3 km southwest of Dimitra, 10 km southeast of Kyllini and 30 km northwest of Pyrgos.

The town has two elementary schools and one high school building, with a standard junior high school and a music oriented junior high school (the only one in Elis). There are also two churches with yards, and a town square with cafes and tavernas. In 1988 and in 2002, two big earthquakes struck the town and most buildings were damaged, including its high school.

== Population ==
| Year | Town | Community | Municipal unit |
|---|---|---|---|
| 1981 | 3,216 | - | - |
| 1991 | 3,182 | - | 5,640 |
| 2001 | 3,093 | 3,714 | 5,348 |
| 2011 | 3,603 | 4,271 | 5,899 |
| 2021 | 3,979 | 4,478 | 6,145 |

== Subdivisions ==
The municipal unit Vartholomio is subdivided into the following communities (constituent villages in brackets):

- Dimitra (Dimitra, Regklaiika)
- Kalyvia Myrtountion
- Lygia (Lygia, Arkoudi, Glyfa, Paralia)
- Machos
- Vartholomio (Vartholomio, Agios Panteleimonas, Vationas, Vranas, Thines, Kokkala, Romeika, Stroumpouli)

The village Vranas had 316 inhabitants in 2011. It is 2 km northwest of Vartholomio.

== See also ==
- List of settlements in Elis
