= Kavasila, Elis =

Kavasila Καβάσιλα
- Community
- Location within Greece
- Coordinates: 37°52.5′N 21°16′E
- Country: Greece
- Administrative region: West Greece
- Regional unit: Elis
- Municipality: Pineios
- Municipal unit: Gastouni
- Elevation: 20 m (66 ft)

Population (2021)
  - Community: 1,231
- Time zone: UTC+2 (EET)
  - Summer (DST): UTC+3 (EEST)
- Postal code: 273 00
- Area code: 26230

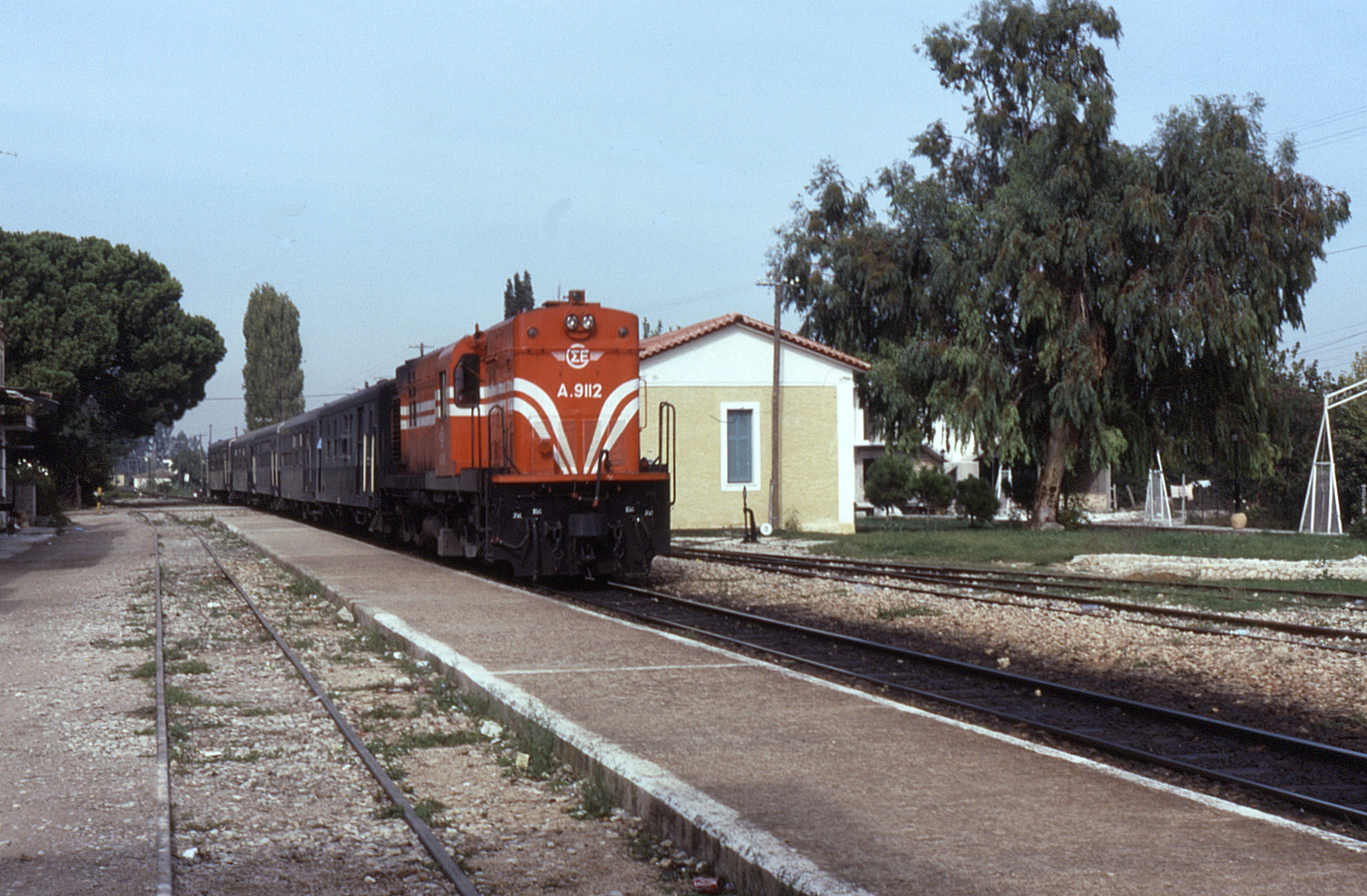

Kavasila (Greek: Καβάσιλα, also Καβάσιλας) is a village in the municipal unit of Gastouni, Elis, Greece. Its population is around 1,200. It is situated in a flat rural area, on the right bank of the river Pineios, at about 20 metres (66 ft) elevation. It is 1 kilometre (0.6 mi) northwest of Lefkochori, 2 kilometres (1 mi) east of Kardiakafti, 3 kilometres (2 mi) south of Andravida and 3 kilometres (2 mi) northeast of Gastouni. Kavasila had a train station on the line from Patras to Kalamata via Pyrgos. A branch line to Vartholomio and Kyllini was shut down around 2001. The Greek National Road 9 (Patras - Pyrgos) passes east of the village.

== Population history ==
Year	Population
1981	1,032
1991	1,147
2001	1,474
2011	1,252
2021	1,231

== See also ==
- List of settlements in Elis
