= Chavari =

Chavari Χαβάρι
- Community
- Location within Greece
- Coordinates: 37°51′N 21°23′E
- Country: Greece
- Administrative region: Western Greece
- Regional unit: Elis
- Municipality: Ilida
- Municipal unit: Amaliada

Population (2021)
  - Community: 1,012
- Time zone: UTC+2 (EET)
  - Summer (DST): UTC+3 (EEST)

Chavari (Greek: Χαβάρι) is a village and a community in the municipal unit of Amaliada, Elis, Greece. The community consists of the villages Chavari, Pera Chavari and Agios Georgios. Chavari is 6 km northeast of Amaliada.

== Person ==
- Christos Laskaris, poet
