= Hellanodikai =

Judges of the ancient Olympic Games

The Hellanodikai (Ancient Greek: Ἑλλανοδίκαι, literally meaning Judges of the Greeks; sing. Ἑλλανοδίκας) were the judges of the Ancient Olympic Games, and the success of the games was attributed to their efforts. It was their sacred duty to maintain the standards and legacy of the games, as well as uphold the rules.

== History ==
One Hellanodikas was a type of Greek public official termed generally the agonothetes (English transliteration), Ancient Greek: Ἀγωνοθέται, Agōnothetai, meaning game organisers), magistrates chosen specifically for the purpose of establishing and maintaining public games. The method of selection depended on the type of government of the founding state. Different states might give particular names to the agonothetes of particular games; for example, the agonothetes of the Pythian games at Athens were called athlothetes. As Athens was a democracy, they were democratically elected. The origin of the agonothetes of the Olympic games is lost in prehistory. The legendary Hercules, founder of the games in Doric legend, would have been the first legendary agonothete. However that may be, the agonothetes of the historical Olympic games were the Hellanodikai. Originally, perhaps, if only in legend, there may have been only one Hellanodikas, but this expanded, reaching as high as twelve members and then settling on ten in 348 BC. They supervised individual events, with a senior Hellanodikas as an overseer.

== Selection and Training ==
Hellanodikai were handpicked from people living in the region of Elis, as Elis was responsible for the running of the Olympics. Originally the post was hereditary, but this was changed, and an Elean from each of the ruling families were elected as a Hellanodikas. Their post only lasted for one Olympiad, and elections took place for each of the subsequent games.

In the ten months preceding the games, the Hellanodikai lived in a specially made building in Elis, called the Hellanodikaion. This building was close to the gymnasiums where the athletes trained in preparation for the games. While staying at the Hellanodikaion, they were trained by the nomophylakes (νομοφύλακες, meaning 'guardians of the law') in the rules and regulations of the olympic games.

== Function ==
=== Judgement ===
The Hellanodikai were renowned for their fairness, and the public held them in high regard. While bribery and cheating among the athletes was commonplace, there was only one recorded case of corruption among the judges, where a Hellanodikas won two equestrian events. To remain impartial, the Hellanodikai were no longer allowed to participate in the games, and this remained the only blemish on their otherwise impeccable record, at least so far as the record survives.

Another task for the Hellanodikai was to supervise the training of the athletes, where they selected those who were well trained, rejecting those who were not performing at a satisfactory level. The trainers for the individual athletes had to be present, but could not intervene or they were punished accordingly. They evaluated each athlete on behaviour, character and morality, as well as the more standard attributes such as power, stamina, and resistance. Those that were approved were entered into a special list called the leukoma (λεύκωμα).

=== Ritual ===
Besides being judges and umpires, the Hellanodikai also were the games' organizing committee, and were present at every ceremony and event that took place, having the honour of presenting the crowns and palm branches to the winners. They were also expected to police the games.

Two days before the games, the athletes who were eligible left Elis for Olympia, in a procession led by the Hellanodikai.
