= Elis (city) =

Ancient city-state, capital city of the district of Elis

- Ἦλις (Ancient Greek)
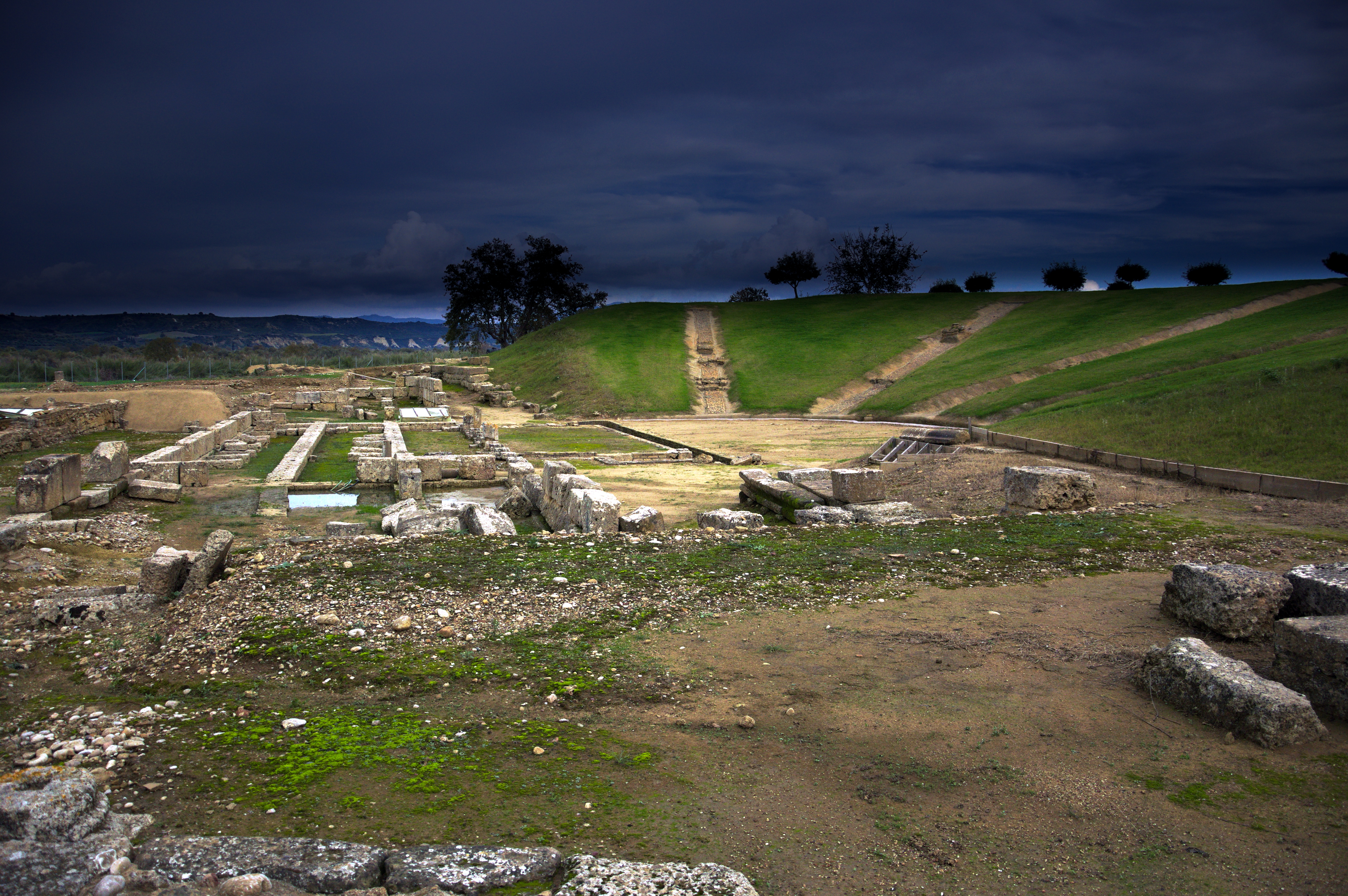
- Remains of the theatre of Elis

- Location within Peloponnese
- 37°53′29″N 21°22′30″E
- Region: Peloponnese
- Part of: Ancient Elis

Elis (Attic Greek: Ἦλις, Doric Greek: Ἆλις, in the local dialect: Ϝᾶλις, Modern Greek: Ήλιδα, romanized: Ilida) was the capital city of the ancient polis (city-state) of Elis, and at the time of Pausanias (2nd c. AD) one of the most populous and splendid cities of the ancient Greek world.

Its main importance was as the organiser of the ancient Olympic Games for more than 1000 years.

Many monumental buildings of the city have been excavated and can be seen today.

== Location ==
It was situated in the northwest of the Peloponnese, to the west of Arcadia. Just before the river Peneius emerges from the hills into the plain, the valley of the river is contracted on the south by a projecting hill of a peaked form, and nearly 500 feet (150 m) in height. This hill was the acropolis of Elis, and commanded the narrow valley of the Peneius as the open plain beyond. The city lay at the foot of the hill, and extended across the river, as Strabo says that the Peneius flowed through the city.

== History ==
Elis is mentioned as a town of the Epeii by Homer in the Catalogue of Ships in the Iliad; but in the earliest times the two chief towns in the country appear to have been Ephyra, the residence of Augeias in the interior, and Buprasium on the coast. Some writers suppose that Ephyra was the more ancient name of Elis, but it appears to have been a different place, situated upon the Ladon.

The first synoecis (unification of neighbouring townships and settling of the Aetolians and Dorians under king Oxylus) of the city is placed by ancient authors at the end of the 12th-beginning of the 11th c BC, in the era of the "Descent of the Dorians" and is corroborated by excavation findings. A new phase of growth took place in the sub-Mycenaean and early Geometric times (11-9th c BC).

=== Growth of Olympic Games ===
In the course of the Archaic period (8th-6th c BC), the city gradually came to organise the games at Olympia, even if 58 km distant, and the traditional origin story is that the first king of Elis, Aethlius, first organised the games, followed by successive kings. Probably in 776 BC King Iphitos of Elis, Lycurgus of Sparta and Kleosthenes of Pisa made the Olympic truce treaty which set the conditions for the acme achieved subsequently in Classical times. By this law the territories of Elis and Olympia were made sacrosanct so that no army or armed men could enter there, and all wars must stop for the month of the games (later extended to 3 months) to allow athletes and followers to travel and take part. The treaty was recorded by the Eleians on a bronze disc kept in the Temple of Hera at Olympia. It remained respected by all ancient Greeks as international law for centuries and violations were punished by the Olympic Council with heavy fines and other penalties.

Athletes participating in the games were obliged to train for at least the prior month at Elis or Olympia, which led to a great influx to the city. On the eve of the games the Hellanodicai, the athletes and their trainers had to walk the 58 km from Elis to Olympia along the sacred way, heading the procession of all other participants including foreign visitors and pilgrims with their rich votive offerings and the animals for sacrifice. The procession took 2 days passing Piera, a sacred spring, where they made sacrifices and stayed overnight at the town of Letrinoi.

The female games, the Heraia in honour of Hera, were also organised by the "sixteen women" of Elis at a different time from the male games. They also followed the sacred way to Olympia.

=== Development of the city ===
In 471 BC its second synoecism took place and settlers appear to have chosen the hill which later formed Elis's acropolis for the city. From this time it was the residence of the kings, and of the aristocratic families who governed the country after the abolition of royalty. Elis was the only fortified town in the state; the rest of the population dwelt in unwalled villages. At this time Elis was laid out in a rectangular Hippodamian urban plan that extended across an area of 150 hectares and which included extensive athletic facilities, an agora with porticos, hippodrome, sanctuaries and precincts, as well as the main core of the city with workshops, shops and residences. These were all needed for the crowds of visitors and athletes who poured into the city as required before the Olympic Games.

Soon after the Greco-Persian Wars from 449 BC the exclusive privileges of the aristocratic families in Elis were abolished and a democratic government established. Along with this revolution a great change took place in Elis: the inhabitants of many separate townships, eight according to Strabo, moved to the capital and extended the city around the acropolis but left it undefended by walls, relying upon the sanctity of their country. At the same time the Eleians were divided into a certain number of local tribes; or if the latter existed before, they now acquired for the first time political rights. The Hellanodicae, or presidents of the Ancient Olympic Games, who had formerly been taken from the aristocratic families, were now appointed by lot, one from each of the local tribes; and the fluctuating number of the Hellanodicae shows the increase and decrease from time to time of the Eleian territory. It is probable that each of the three districts into which Elis was divided, Hollow Elis, Pisatis, and Triphylia, contained four tribes. This is in accordance with the fourfold ancient division of Hollow Elis, and with the "twice four" townships in the Pisatis.

In the Peloponnesian Wars Elis first joined the Spartans but later went to the Athenian side.

Pausanias in his account of the number of the Hellanodicae says that there were 12 Hellanodicae in the 103rd Olympiad, immediately after the Battle of Leuctra in 371 BC, when the Eleians recovered their ancient dominions for a short time, but being shortly afterwards deprived of Triphylia by the Arcadians, the number of their tribes was reduced to eight.

The role and development of the city continued into Hellenistic times (end of 4th-2nd c BC) when the theatre was built. Roman Imperial times (1st-4th c AD) saw the reconstruction of many public and private buildings. The cessation of the Games in 393 AD led Elis to decline. During the Early Christian period (5th-6th c AD) the act of converting an ancient portico into a basilica contributed to prolong life in the city until the final abandonment of the area at the end of the 6th c AD.

== The Site ==
Most public buildings were probably on the left bank of the river, as no remains are now found on the right or northern bank and Pausanias does not make any allusion to the river in his description of the city.

Athletes arrived here from all over the Hellenic world in order to take part in the Olympic Games and they and their companions were obliged to reside for at least one month in Elis in order to train in the city's gymnasia and to learn the rules of the Games.

Close to the training grounds stood a temple of Artemis Philomeirax and the cenotaph of Achilles. Also the temple of Hades which was opened only once a year.

The Loikos was for the sixteen Eleian women who wove the peplos of Hera and organised the Heraia, the female games at Olympia.

=== Gymnasium ===
The gymnasium and agora occupied the greater part of the space between the river and the citadel. The gymnasium was by far the largest in Greece to cater for all the athletes of the Ancient Olympic Games obliged to stay here for the previous month. The enclosure bore the general name of Xystus, and within it were special places destined for the runners, and separated from one another by plane-trees. The gymnasium contained three subdivisions, called respectively Plethrium, Tetragonum, and Malco: the first so-called from its dimensions, the second from its shape, and the third from the softness of the soil. In the Malco was the bouleuterion (council chamber) of the Eleians, called Lalichium from the name of its founders: it was also used for literary exhibitions.

The gymnasium had two principal entrances, one leading by the street called Siope or Silence to the baths, and the other above the cenotaph of Achilles to the agora and the Hellanodicaeum.

=== Agora ===
The agora occupies a plateau between the athletics training areas to the west and the theatre. According to Pausanias the agora was of the "older style" as instead of being surrounded by uninterrupted stoae or colonnades, its stoae were separated with roads, while it had also space for a hippodrome for training horses.

Excavations have revealed the foundations of the stoas. The southern stoa consisted of a triple row of Doric columns and was the usual resort of the Hellanodicae during the day. Towards one end of this stoa divided from the agora by a street was the Hellanodicaeum, a building which was their official residence and where they received their instruction in their duties for ten months preceding the festival.

The other, "Corcyraean", stoa, because it had been built out of the tenth of some spoils from the Corcyraeans, consisted of two rows of Doric columns with a partition wall running between them: one side was open to the agora, and the other to a temple of Aphrodite Urania, in which was a statue of the goddess in gold and ivory by Pheidias. In the open part of the agora, Pausanias mentions the temple of Apollo Acacesius, which was the principal temple in Elis, as well as statues of Helios and Selene (Sun and Moon), a temple of the Graces, a temple of Silenus, and the tomb of Oxylus.

=== Theatre ===
The theatre is on the slope of the acropolis: it is described by Pausanias as lying between the agora and the Menius, which, if the name is not corrupt, must be the brook flowing down from the heights behind the old town. Near the theatre was a temple of Dionysus, containing a statue of this god by Praxiteles.

=== Acropolis ===
On the acropolis was a temple of Athena, containing a statue of the goddess in gold and ivory by Pheidias. On the summit of the acropolis are the remains of a later castle, in the walls of which Ernst Curtius noticed, when he visited in the 19th century, some fragments of Doric columns which probably belonged to the temple of Athena.

In the immediate neighbourhood of Elis was Petra, where the tomb of the philosopher Pyrrho was shown.

== Notable people ==
- Eupolemos of Elis
- Phaedo of Elis
