= Amaliada =

Town in the Peloponnese, Greece

Amaliada Αμαλιάδα (Amaliátha)
- Municipal unit
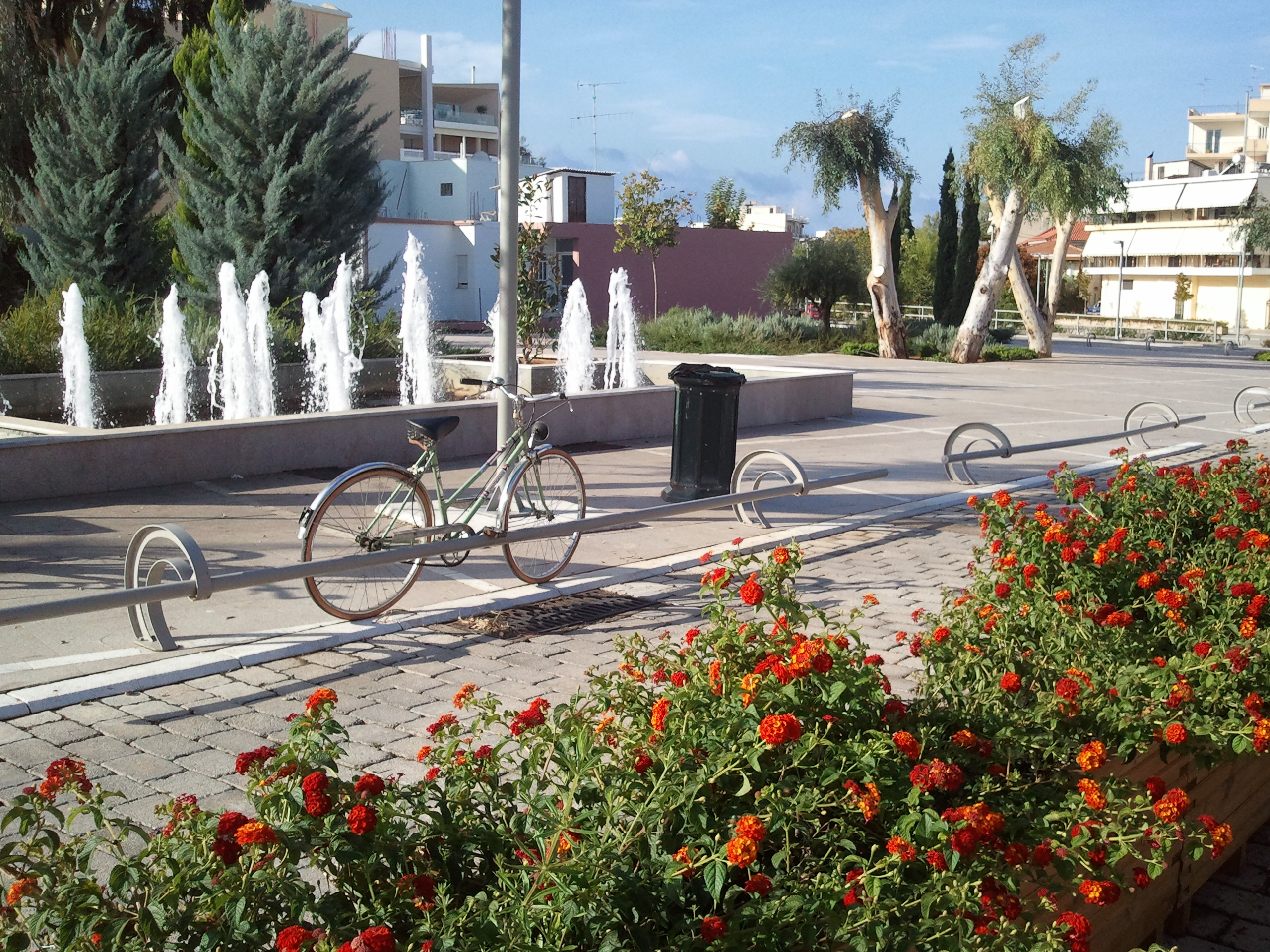
- Town square

- Location within the regional unit

- Location within Greece
- Coordinates: 37°48′N 21°21′E
- Country: Greece
- Geographic region: Peloponnese
- Administrative region: West Greece
- Regional unit: Elis
- Municipality: Ilida

Area
  - Municipal unit: 251.945 km^{2} (97.277 sq mi)
- Elevation: 6 m (20 ft)

Population (2021)
  - Municipal unit: 26,315
  - Municipal unit density: 104.45/km^{2} (270.52/sq mi)
  - Community: 18,223
- Time zone: UTC+2 (EET)
  - Summer (DST): UTC+3 (EEST)
- Postal code: 272 00, 270 69, 273 00
- Area code: 26220
- Vehicle registration: ΗΑ

Amaliada (Greek: Αμαλιάδα, Katharevousa: Ἀμαλιάς, Amaliás) is a town and a former municipality in northwestern Elis, in the West Greece Region of Greece. Since the 2011 local government reform it is part of the municipality Ilida, of which it is the seat and a municipal unit. The municipal unit has an area of 251.945 km^{2}. It is near the archaeological site of Elis, the city-state whose territory was the site of the ancient Olympic Games. It is situated in the plains of Elis, 6 km from the Ionian Sea. It is 10 km southeast of Gastouni, 16 km northwest of Pyrgos and 60 km southwest of Patras.

Amaliada was named after Queen Amalia of Greece in the 1830s, and formed by merging two communes, Kalitsa and Dervitselepi. It features a city square with pine trees and a fountain. Most of the streets are in grid order running almost due north, south, east, and west. On the east side, Amaliada has a public sports stadium (mainly used for soccer). The hospital and the monastery of Frangavilla are in the southeast. Amaliada has a train station on the line from Patras to Pyrgos. A street in Amaliada's west side is named Hiroshima in memory of the victims of the nuclear destruction of Hiroshima at the end of World War II. Kourouta and Palouki are the beaches of Amaliada, about 6 km southwest of the town centre.

== Population history ==
| Year | Community | Municipal unit |
|---|---|---|
| 1981 | 15,248 | - |
| 1991 | 15,232 | - |
| 2001 | 20,259 | 31,542 |
| 2011 | 18,303 | 28,520 |
| 2021 | 18,223 | 26,315 |

== Subdivisions ==
The municipal unit Amaliada is subdivided into the following communities (constituent villages in brackets):

- Agios Dimitrios (Agios Dimitrios, Kolokythas)
- Agios Ilias
- Amaliada (Amaliada, Agios Ioannis, Kourouta, Marathea, Palouki, Panagia, Tsafleika, Tsichleika)
- Ampelokampos
- Archaia Ilida
- Avgeio
- Chavari (Chavari, Agios Georgios, Pera Chavari)
- Dafni (Dafni, Kalathas)
- Dafniotissa
- Douneika (Douneika, Agia Marina, Danika, Kato Kertezaiika)
- Geraki (Geraki, Analipsi)
- Kalyvia Ilidos
- Kardamas (Kardamas, Petroules)
- Kentro
- Keramidia
- Kryonero
- Peristeri (Peristeri, Asteraiika, Palaiolanthi)
- Roviata (Roviata, Kasidiaris, Paralia, Romeika)
- Savalia
- Sosti

== Sporting teams ==
Amaliada is the seat of Koroivos which plays in A1 Ethniki. The town also hosts the football team Asteras Amaliada F.C. with earlier presence in Gamma Ethniki.

Sport clubs based in Amaliada
| Club | Founded | Sports | Achievements |
|---|---|---|---|
| Asteras Amaliada F.C. | 1947 | Football | Earlier presence in Gamma Ethniki |
| Koroivos Amaliadas | 1983 | Basketball, Volleyball | Presence in A1 Ethniki Basketball |

== Notable people ==
- Nikos Beloyannis (1915–1952), communist and resistance leader
- Mitsos Alexandropoulos (1924–2008), writer
- Panos Karnezis (1967- ), writer
- Yovanna (1938- ), singer and author
- Angeliki Skarlatou (1976- ), sailor
- Rallis (1994- ), Airman

== Twin towns — sister cities ==
Amaliada is twinned with:

- Edremit, Turkey since 2000

== See also ==
- Kourouta
- List of settlements in Elis
