= Ladon (river of Elis) =

Location
- Country: Greece

Physical characteristics
- Source
  - location: Peloponnese
- Mouth: Pineios
  - location: Pineios Reservoir
  - coordinates: 37°53′26″N 21°31′35″E
- Length: 37.7 km (23.4 mi)

Basin features
- Progression: Pineios→ Ionian Sea

The Ladon (Ancient Greek and Katharevousa: Λάδων, Ládōn; Demotic Greek: Λάδωνας, Ládōnas), or Pineiakos Ladonas (Greek: Πηνειακός Λάδωνας), to distinguish it from the river of the same name in Arcadia, is a river of Elis in Greece. It rises in the highlands to the south of Mount Erymanthus; it flows at first through a narrow ravine, and, anciently flowed into the Peneius, but now flows into the Pineios Reservoir, a man-made lake created by the Peneus Dam. It is 37.7 km (23.4 mi) long. The river is called the Selleeis (Σελλήεις) by Homer.
