= Gastouni =

Town in Elis, Greece

Gastouni Γαστούνη
- Municipal unit
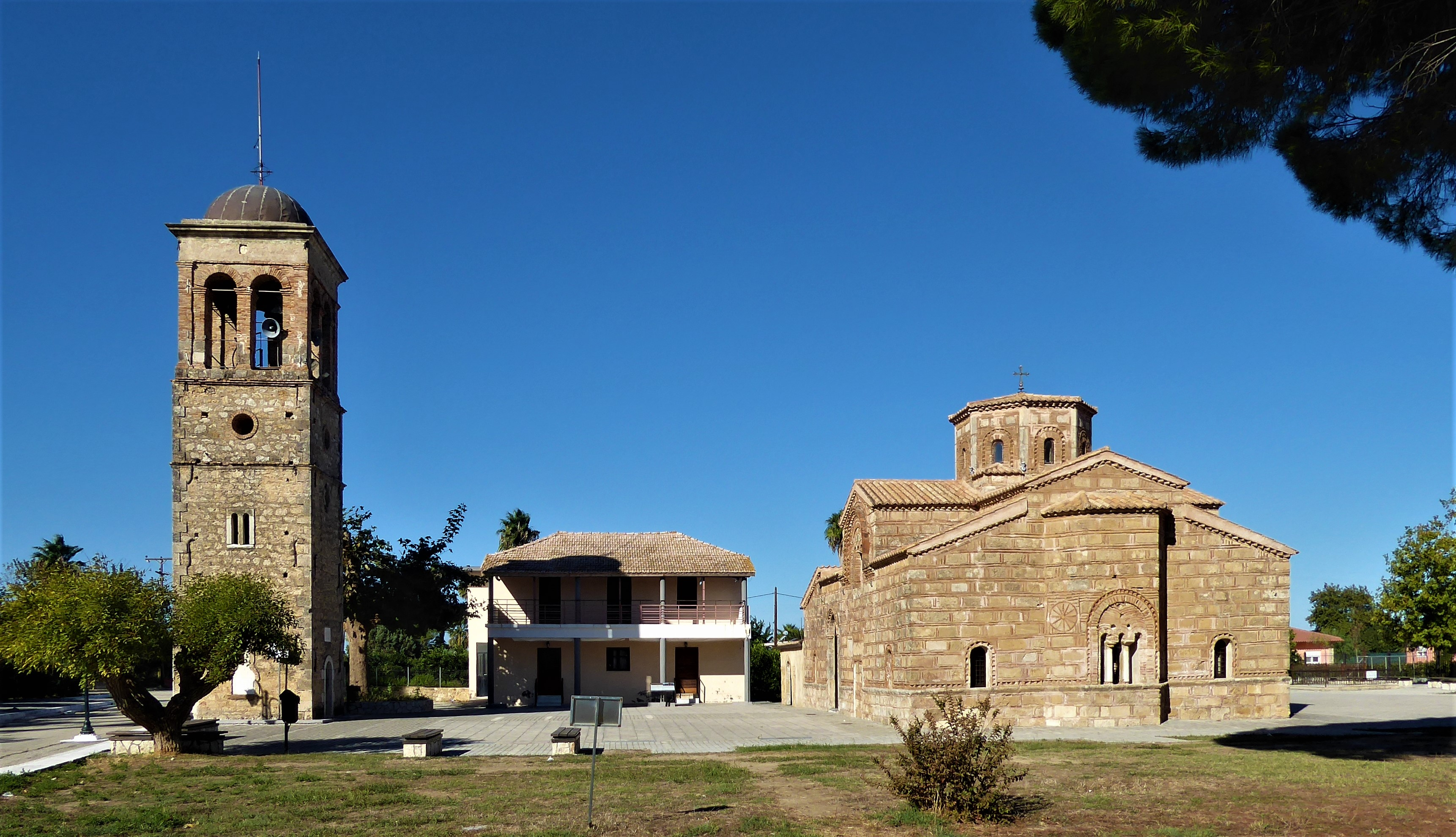

- Location within the regional unit

- Location within Greece
- Coordinates: 37°52′N 21°15′E
- Country: Greece
- Geographic region: Peloponnese
- Administrative region: West Greece
- Regional unit: Elis
- Municipality: Pineios

Area
  - Municipal unit: 59.325 km^{2} (22.906 sq mi)
- Elevation: 5 m (16 ft)

Population (2021)
  - Municipal unit: 11,204
  - Municipal unit density: 188.86/km^{2} (489.14/sq mi)
- Time zone: UTC+2 (EET)
  - Summer (DST): UTC+3 (EEST)
- Postal code: 273 00
- Area code: 26230
- Vehicle registration: ΗΑ

Gastouni (Greek: Γαστούνη) is a town and a former municipality in Elis, Greece. Since the 2011 local government reform it is part of the municipality Pineios, of which it is the seat and a municipal unit. The municipal unit has an area of 59.325 km^{2}. Gastouni is situated in a flat rural area, 5 km from the Ionian Sea. The river Pineios flows into the sea near Gastouni. The town is 6 km (4 mi) south of Andravida, 4 km (2 mi) east of Vartholomio, 11 km (7 mi) northwest of Amaliada and 26 km (16 mi) northwest of Pyrgos. The Greek National Road 9/E55 (Patras - Pyrgos) and the railway from Patras to Pyrgos pass east of Gastouni. There is a 12th-century Byzantine church in the southwestern quarter Katholiki.

== Subdivisions ==
The municipal unit Gastouni is subdivided into the following communities:

- Gastouni
- Kardiakafti
- Kavasila
- Koroivos
- Lefkochori
- Palaiochori
- Roupaki

== Population history ==
Year	Town population	Municipal unit population
1981	4,751	-
1991	5,883	9,350
2001	7,524	11,699
2011	7,485	11,254
2021	7,683	11,054

== People ==
- Nikos Kachtitis, writer
- The Sisinis family
  - Chrysanthos Sisinis
  - Georgios Sisinis, one of the famous Greek revolutionary leaders of the area

== See also ==
- List of settlements in Elis
