= Pineios (municipality) =

Pineios Πηνειός
- Municipality
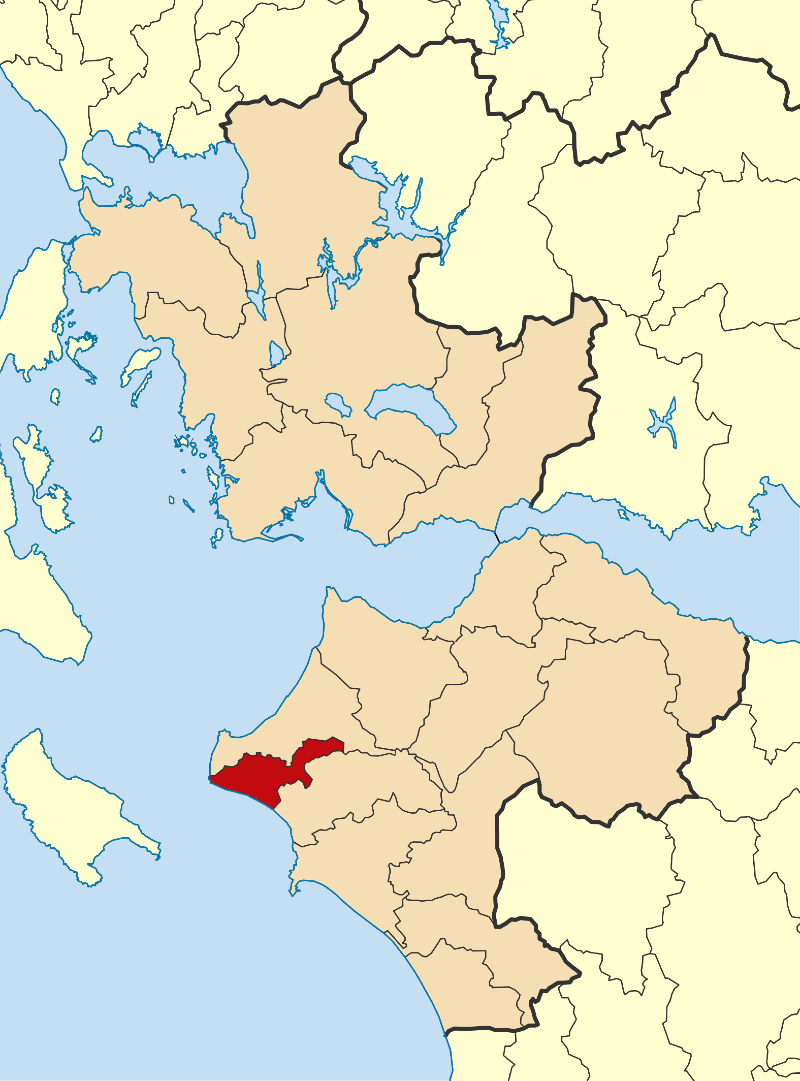

- Location within Greece
- Coordinates: 37°52′N 21°15′E
- Country: Greece
- Administrative region: West Greece
- Regional unit: Elis
- Seat: Gastouni

Area
  - Municipality: 161.5 km^{2} (62.4 sq mi)

Population (2021)
  - Municipality: 21,625
  - Density: 133.9/km^{2} (346.8/sq mi)
- Time zone: UTC+2 (EET)
  - Summer (DST): UTC+3 (EEST)

Pineios (Greek: Πηνειός) is a municipality in the Elis regional unit, West Greece region, Greece. The seat of the municipality is the town Gastouni. The municipality has an area of 161.496 km^{2}. It was named after the river Pineios.

== Municipality ==
The municipality Pineios was formed at the 2011 local government reform by the merger of the following 3 former municipalities, that became municipal units:

- Gastouni
- Tragano
- Vartholomio
