= Ilida (municipality) =

Ilida Ήλιδα
- Municipality
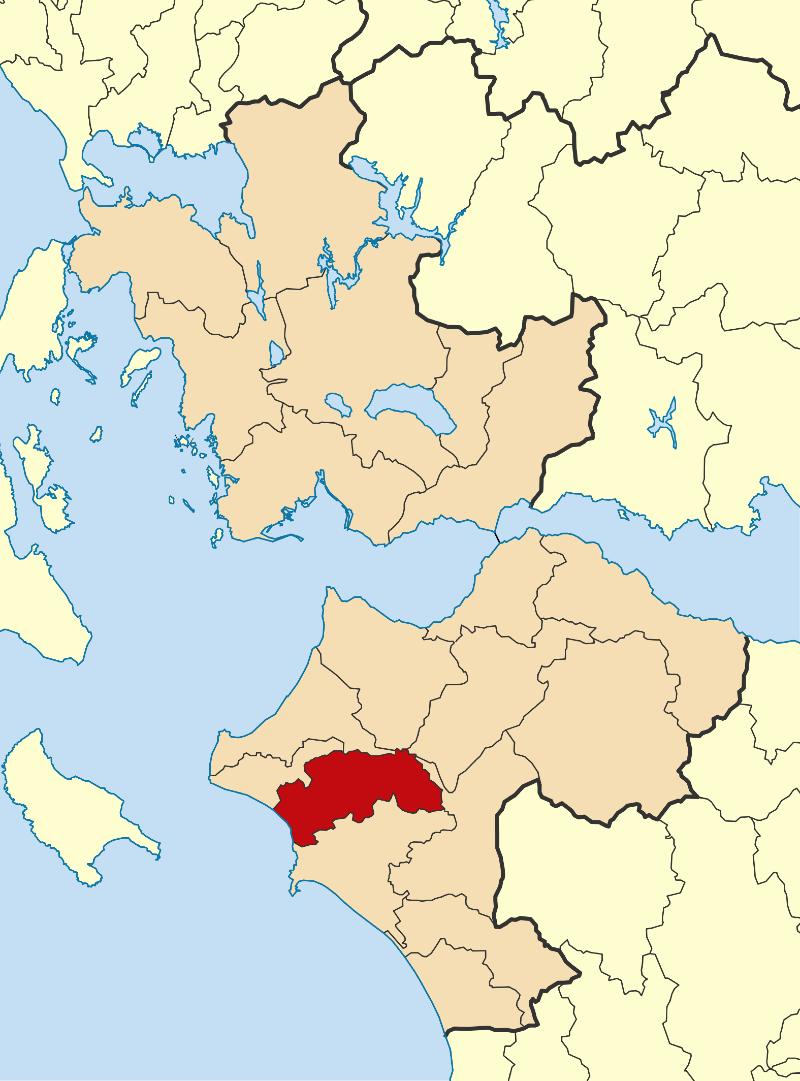

- Location within Greece
- Coordinates: 37°48′N 21°21′E
- Country: Greece
- Administrative region: West Greece
- Regional unit: Elis
- Seat: Amaliada

Area
  - Municipality: 400.5 km^{2} (154.6 sq mi)

Population (2021)
  - Municipality: 29,347
  - Density: 73.28/km^{2} (189.8/sq mi)
- Time zone: UTC+2 (EET)
  - Summer (DST): UTC+3 (EEST)

Ilida (Greek: Ήλιδα) is a municipality in the Elis regional unit, West Greece region, Greece. The seat of the municipality is the town Amaliada. The municipality has an area of 400.517 km^{2}. It was named after the ancient region and city Elis.

== Municipality ==
The municipality Ilida was formed at the 2011 local government reform by the merger of the following 2 former municipalities, that became municipal units:

- Amaliada
- Pineia
