= Pineios (Peloponnese) =

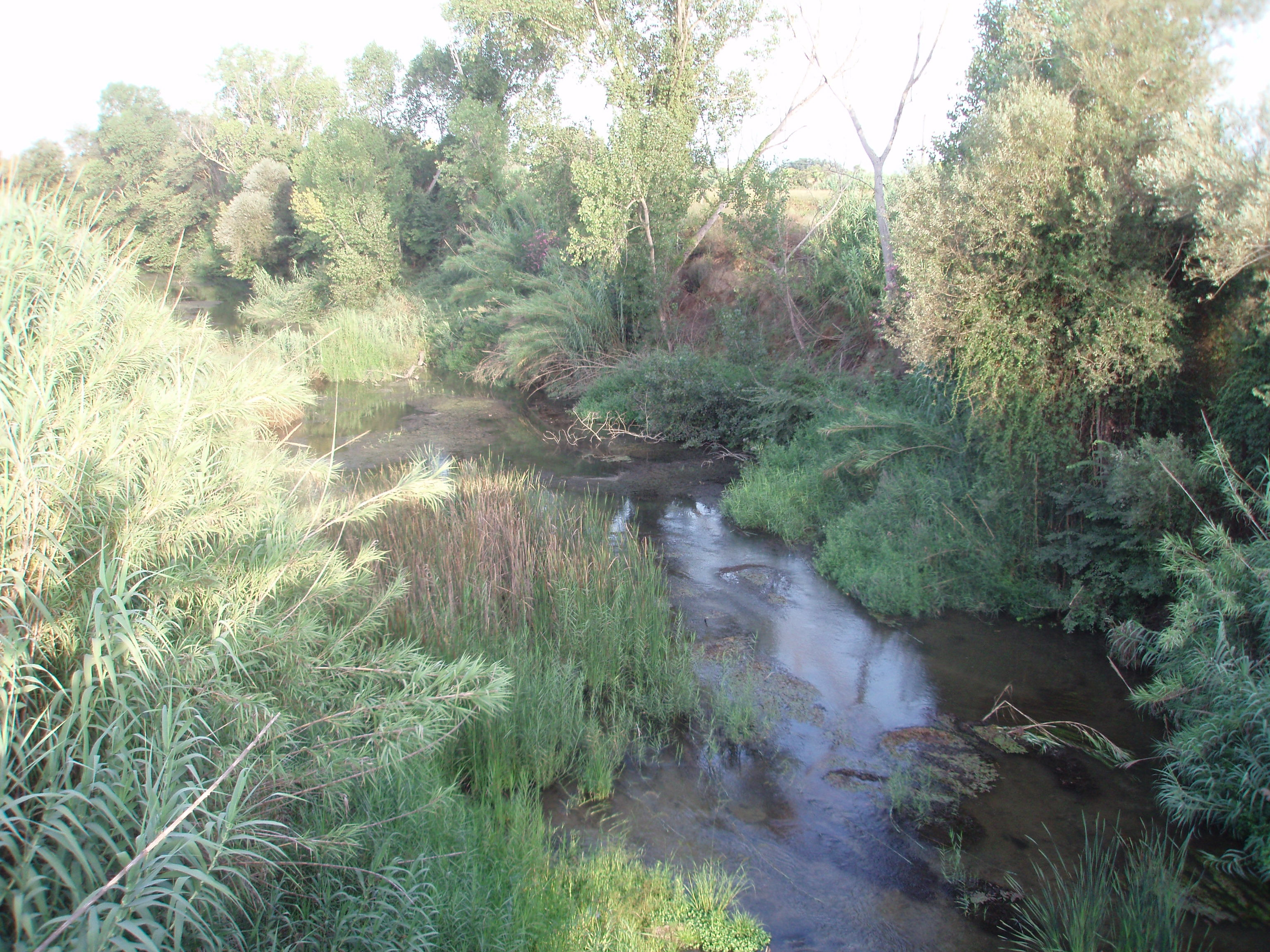

Location
- Country: Greece

Physical characteristics
- Source
  - location: Peloponnese
- Mouth
  - location: Ionian Sea
  - coordinates: 37°48′19″N 21°14′12″E
- Length: 70 km (43 mi)

Basin features
- Tributaries
  - left: Ladon

The Pineiós (Greek: Πηνειός, Latin: Peneus) is a river in Peloponnese, Greece. It is probably not named after the god Peneus. It is 70 km (43 mi) long. Its source is on the southwestern slope of the mountain Erymanthus, near the village Kryovrysi. It empties into a bay of the Ionian Sea, southwest of Gastouni. For a part of its upper course, it forms the border between Elis and Achaea. The river flows through the plain of Elis. The river passes through the following villages:

- Kryovrysi
- Agia Triada
- Kalfas
- Kentro
- Kalyvia Ilidos
- Agia Mavra
- Kavasila
- Vartholomio

== History ==
In the 1960s, the government began building an earth-shaped dam named the Peneus Dam (Φράγμα Πηνειού Fragma Pineiou) to supply water for the north and much of Elis. The dam is considered the highest dam in Elis. In Greek mythology, the Peneus and Alpheus were two rivers re-routed by Heracles in his fifth labour in order to clean the filth from the Augean Stables in a single day, a task which had been presumed to be impossible.
