= Skillountia =

Skillountia Σκιλλουντία
- Community
- Location within Greece
- Coordinates: 37°36′N 21°41′E
- Country: Greece
- Administrative region: West Greece
- Regional unit: Elis
- Municipality: Andritsaina-Krestena
- Municipal unit: Skillounta

Population (2021)
  - Community: 458
- Time zone: UTC+2 (EET)
  - Summer (DST): UTC+3 (EEST)

Skillountia (Greek: Σκιλλουντία, before 1915: Μάζι - Mazi) is a small village and a community in the municipal unit of Skillounta, Elis, Greece. The community includes the village Nea Skillountia. Skillountia is located in the hills south of the river Alfeios. It is 2 km southwest of Frixa, 3 km northeast of Gryllos, 6 km east of Krestena and 7 km southeast of Olympia.

== Population ==
Year	Population village	Community population
1991	45	-
2001	28	550
2011	20	341
2021	40	458

== History ==
Skillountia is named after the ancient Triphylian city Scillus. The city featured the Temple of Skillountian Athena. Strabo mentioned that it was founded next to the Alpheus in the area of Fellona (Φελλώνα). Inside the city was the Temple of the Ephesian Artemis which was constructed by Xenophon.

Having been granted land here by the Lacedaemonians (Spartans), who controlled the area following the Peloponnesian war, Xenophon lived for approximately 30 years in the city (400 - 371 BCE, expelled after Sparta was defeated at the Battle of Leuctra) and resided later there following his adventures in Asia, for which he was exiled by the Athenians on account of the help which he brought to Cyrus the Younger, an enemy of Athens, which was allied to the King of Persia, Artaxerxes II.

The ancient city has been found in the locality of Profitis Ilias, near Makrisia. The ruins of the Temple of Athena and several buildings have been excavated.

== See also ==
- List of settlements in Elis
