= Samiko =

Samiko Σαμικό
- Community
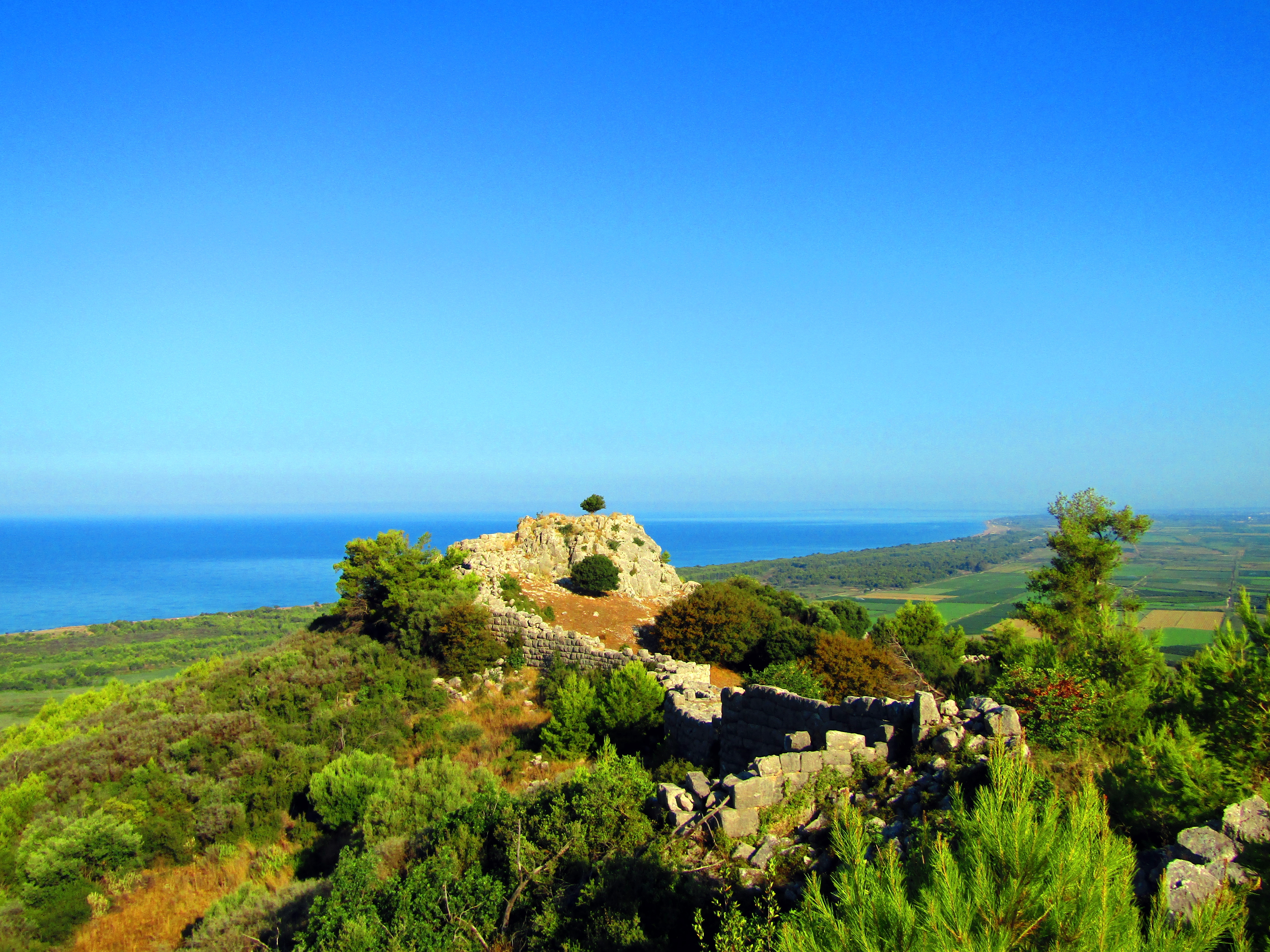
- Acropolis of Samiko

- Location within Greece
- Coordinates: 37°34′N 21°35′E
- Country: Greece
- Administrative region: West Greece
- Regional unit: Elis
- Municipality: Andritsaina-Krestena
- Municipal unit: Skillounta

Population (2021)
  - Community: 370
- Time zone: UTC+2 (EET)
  - Summer (DST): UTC+3 (EEST)

Samiko (Greek: Σαμικό, before 1923: Αλή Τσελεπή - Ali Tselepi) is a village in the municipality of Skillounta, Elis, Greece. It is situated on a hill near the Ionian Sea, 2 km south of Kallikomo, 2 km southeast of Raches, 3 km north of Kato Samiko and 4 km southwest of Krestena.

== Population ==
Year	Population
1981	540
1991	540
2001	563
2011	389
2021	370

== History ==
Samiko takes its name from the ancient Elean city, Samikon (Latin: Samicum), which was also known as Samos and Samia. It was probably identical with the Homeric Arene. Samikon was located in the ancient country of Triphylia, near the river Anigros. Near the city and the river was the cave of the Anigrid nymphs. The water here reputedly cured skin diseases. The remains of ancient Samikon have been found on a hill 1 km south of Kato Samiko.

== See also ==
- List of settlements in Elis
