= Skillounta =

Skillounta Σκιλλούντα
- Municipal unit
- Location within the regional unit

- Location within Greece
- Coordinates: 37°37′N 21°38′E
- Country: Greece
- Administrative region: West Greece
- Regional unit: Elis
- Municipality: Andritsaina-Krestena

Area
  - Municipal unit: 194.4 km^{2} (75.1 sq mi)
- Elevation: 276 m (906 ft)

Population (2021)
  - Municipal unit: 8,853
  - Municipal unit density: 45.54/km^{2} (117.9/sq mi)
- Time zone: UTC+2 (EET)
  - Summer (DST): UTC+3 (EEST)
- Postal code: 270 55
- Area code: 26250
- Vehicle registration: ΗΑ

Skillounta is a former municipality in Elis, West Greece, Greece. Since the 2011 local government reform it is part of the municipality Andritsaina-Krestena, of which it is a municipal unit. The municipal unit has an area of 194.409 km^{2}. It is named after the ancient town Scillus, which was in the area. Its seat of administration was in the town Krestena. The territory of the municipal unit Skillounta stretches from the plains on the Ionian Sea coast to the forested mountains of southeastern Elis. The river Alfeios forms its northern border. Krestena is 6 km south of Olympia, 12 km north of Zacharo and 18 km southeast of Pyrgos. The Greek National Road 9/E55 (Patras - Pyrgos - Kyparissia) passes through Kallikomo in the western part of Skillounta, and the Greek National Road 76 to Andritsaina and Megalopoli runs west to east through Krestena and Graikas.

== Subdivisions ==
The municipal unit Skillounta is subdivided into the following communities (constituent villages in brackets):

- Diasella (Diasella, Ladikaki, Papa Chania, Skala)
- Frixa (Frixa, Anemochoraki)
- Graikas
- Gryllos (Gryllos, Chani Gryllou)
- Kallikomo (Kallikomo, Krounoi, Ladiko)
- Kalyvakia (Nea Kalyvakia)
- Kato Samiko (Kato Samiko, Kleidi, Fragkokklisia)
- Krestena (Krestena, Moschoula, Poros)
- Makrisia
- Platiana
- Ploutochori (Neo Chorio)
- Raches
- Samiko
- Skillountia (Skillountia, Nea Skillountia)
- Trypiti (Trypiti, Lekani)
- Vrina

== Sites of interest ==
- Iardanos Tomb - near the village Kleidi, community of Kato Samiko. It was excavated in 1954 and contained 16 graves.

== Population ==
Year	Municipal unit
1991	14,449
2001	15,931
2011	10,303
2021	8,853

== See also ==
- List of settlements in Elis
