= Raches, Elis =

Raches Ράχες
- Community
- Location within Greece
- Coordinates: 37°35′N 21°34′E
- Country: Greece
- Administrative region: West Greece
- Regional unit: Elis
- Municipality: Andritsaina-Krestena
- Municipal unit: Skillounta

Population (2021)
  - Community: 359
- Time zone: UTC+2 (EET)
  - Summer (DST): UTC+3 (EEST)

Raches (Greek: Ράχες) is a village in the municipal unit of Skillounta, Elis, Greece. It is located near the Ionian Sea, between the Greek National Road 9 (E55, Patras - Pyrgos - Kyparissia) and the railway from Pyrgos to Kalamata. It is 2 km southeast of Anemochori, 2 km west of Kallikomo, 2 km northwest of Samiko and 5 km west of Krestena.

== Population ==
Year	Population
1981	287
1991	376
2001	361
2011	383
2021	359

== See also ==
- List of settlements in Elis
