= List of settlements in Elis =

This is a list of settlements in Elis, Greece.

- Achladini
- Aetorrachi
- Agios Andreas, Katakolo
- Agia Anna
- Agia Kyriaki
- Agia Mavra
- Agia Triada
- Agioi Apostoloi
- Agios Charalampos
- Agios Dimitrios
- Agios Georgios
- Agios Ilias, Amaliada
- Agios Ilias, Pyrgos
- Agios Ilias, Zacharo
- Agios Ioannis
- Agnanta
- Agrapidochori
- Agridi
- Alfeiousa
- Alifeira
- Alpochori
- Amaliada
- Ampelokampos
- Ampelonas
- Amygdalies
- Andravida
- Andritsaina
- Anemochori
- Anilio
- Anthonas
- Antroni
- Archaia Ilida
- Archaia Olympia
- Archaia Pisa
- Areti
- Arini
- Artemida
- Arvaniti
- Aspra Spitia
- Astras
- Avgeio
- Avgi
- Borsi
- Charia
- Chavari
- Cheimadio
- Chelidoni
- Chrysochori
- Dafni
- Dafniotissa
- Dafnoula
- Diasella
- Dimitra
- Doukas
- Douneika
- Dragogio
- Efyra
- Elaionas
- Epitalio
- Fanari
- Figaleia
- Flokas
- Foloi
- Fonaitika
- Frixa
- Gastouni
- Geraki
- Giannitsochori
- Goumero
- Graikas
- Granitsaiika
- Gryllos
- Irakleia
- Kafkonia
- Kakotari
- Kakovatos
- Kalidona
- Kallikomo
- Kallithea
- Kalyvakia
- Kalyvia Ilidos
- Kalyvia Myrtountion
- Kamena
- Kampos
- Kapeleto
- Karatoula
- Kardamas
- Kardiakafti
- Karya
- Kastro
- Katakolo
- Kato Panagia
- Kato Samiko
- Katsaros
- Kavasila
- Kentro
- Keramidia
- Kladeos
- Klindia
- Koliri
- Korakochori
- Koroivos
- Koryfi
- Koskinas
- Koufopoulo
- Koumanis
- Kourtesi
- Koutsochera
- Krestena
- Kryoneri, Figaleia
- Kryoneri, Olympia
- Kryonero
- Kryovrysi
- Kyllini
- Laganas
- Lalas
- Lampeia
- Lanthi
- Lasteika
- Latas
- Latzoi
- Lechaina
- Lefkochori
- Lepreo
- Leventochori
- Linaria
- Linistaina
- Livadaki
- Loukas
- Louvro
- Lygia
- Machos
- Mageiras
- Magoula
- Makistos
- Makrisia
- Manolada
- Matesi
- Mazaraki
- Melissa
- Milea
- Milies
- Minthi
- Mouria
- Mouzaki
- Myronia
- Myrsini
- Myrtia
- Nea Figaleia
- Nea Manolada
- Neapoli
- Nemouta
- Neochori, Zacharo
- Neochori Myrtountion
- Neraida
- Nisi
- Oinoi
- Oleni
- Oreini
- Palaiochori
- Palaiovarvasaina
- Pefkes
- Pefki
- Pelopio
- Peristeri
- Perivolia
- Persaina
- Petralona
- Platanos
- Platiana
- Ploutochori
- Pournari
- Prasidaki
- Prasino
- Pyrgos
- Raches
- Rodia
- Rodina
- Roupaki
- Rovia
- Roviata
- Salmoni
- Samiko
- Savalia
- Schinoi
- Sekoulas
- Simiza
- Simopoulo
- Skafidia
- Skillountia
- Skliva
- Skourochori
- Smerna
- Smila
- Sopi
- Sosti
- Stafidokampos
- Stomio
- Strefi
- Strousi
- Taxiarches
- Theisoa
- Tragano
- Trypiti
- Tsipiana
- Varda
- Vartholomio
- Varvasaina
- Vasilaki
- Velanidi
- Vouliagmeni
- Vounargo
- Vresto
- Vrina
- Vrochitsa
- Vytinaiika
- Xenies
- Xirochori
- Xirokampos
- Xylokera
- Zacharo

== See also ==
- List of towns and villages in Greece
