= Frixa =

Frixa Φρίξα
- Community
- Location within Greece
- Coordinates: 37°37′N 21°42′E
- Country: Greece
- Administrative region: West Greece
- Regional unit: Elis
- Municipality: Andritsaina-Krestena
- Municipal unit: Skillounta

Population (2021)
  - Community: 301
- Time zone: UTC+2 (EET)
  - Summer (DST): UTC+3 (EEST)

Frixa (Greek: Φρίξα, before 1916: Ανεμοχωράκιον - Anemochorakion) is a village and a community in the municipal unit of Skillounta, Elis, Greece. The community includes the village Anemochoraki. Frixa is on a hill near the left bank of the river Alfeios, 2 km northeast of Skillountia, 7 km southeast of Olympia and 8 km northeast of Krestena.

== Population ==
Year	Population village	Community population
1981	350	-
1991	430	-
2001	319	523
2011	200	309
2021	257	301

== History ==
Phrixa was a hilltop town in the ancient land of Pisa. The town was already ruined in Pausanias' days (2nd century AD). It had a temple of Cydonian Athena. It was said that the temple was founded by Clymenus from Kydonia in Crete, a descendant of Heracles of Ida.

== See also ==
- List of settlements in Elis
