= Graikas =

Graikas Γραίκας
- Community
- Location within Greece
- Coordinates: 37°34′N 21°42′E
- Country: Greece
- Administrative region: West Greece
- Regional unit: Elis
- Municipality: Andritsaina-Krestena
- Municipal unit: Skillounta
- Elevation: 300 m (980 ft)

Population (2021)
  - Community: 177
- Time zone: UTC+2 (EET)
  - Summer (DST): UTC+3 (EEST)
- Postal code: 270 55
- Vehicle registration: HA

Graikas (Greek: Γραίκας) is a mountain village in the municipal unit of Skillounta, Elis, Greece. It is situated on a hillside, 3 km southeast of Gryllos, 8 km southeast of Krestena and 9 km northeast of Zacharo. The Greek National Road 76 passes north of the village. Graikas suffered damage from the 2007 Greek forest fires.

== Population ==
Year	Population
1981	420
1991	338
2001	406
2011	307
2021	177

== See also ==
- List of settlements in Elis
