= Xylokera =

Xylokera Ξυλοκέρα
- Community
- Location within Greece
- Coordinates: 37°44′N 21°24′E
- Country: Greece
- Administrative region: West Greece
- Regional unit: Elis
- Municipality: Pyrgos
- Municipal unit: Iardanos

Population (2021)
  - Community: 288
- Time zone: UTC+2 (EET)
  - Summer (DST): UTC+3 (EEST)

Xylokera (Greek: Ξυλοκέρα) is a village in the municipal unit of Iardanos, Elis, Greece. It is 1 km west of Vounargo, 2 km east of Alpochori and 8 km northwest of Pyrgos.

== Population ==
Year	Population
1981	415
1991	375
2001	439
2011	319
2021	288

== See also ==
- List of settlements in Elis
