= Lasteika =

Lasteika Λαστέικα
- Community
- Location within Greece
- Coordinates: 37°41.6′N 21°24.5′E
- Country: Greece
- Administrative region: West Greece
- Regional unit: Elis
- Municipality: Pyrgos
- Municipal unit: Pyrgos
- Elevation: 30 m (98 ft)

Population (2021)
  - Community: 689
- Time zone: UTC+2 (EET)
  - Summer (DST): UTC+3 (EEST)
- Postal code: 271 00
- Area code: 26210

Lasteika (Greek: Λαστέικα, also: Λασταίικα Lastaiika) is a village and a community in the municipality of Pyrgos, Elis, Greece. It is situated at the foot of a low hill, 4 km northwest of the centre of Pyrgos. It is 2 km southwest of Agios Georgios, 2 km northeast of Vytinaiika, and 3 km southwest of Prasino, in the municipal unit Iardanos. The Greek National Road 9/E55 (Patras - Pyrgos) passes southwest of the village. The community consists of the villages Lasteika and Itia.

== Historical population ==
| Year | Village population | Community population |
|---|---|---|
| 1981 | - | 564 |
| 1991 | - | 493 |
| 2001 | 436 | 612 |
| 2011 | 718 | 815 |
| 2021 | 682 | 689 |

== See also ==
- List of settlements in Elis
