= Alifeira =

Village in Elis, Greece

Alifeira Αλίφειρα
- Municipal unit
- Location within the regional unit

- Location within Greece
- Coordinates: 37°33′N 21°49′E
- Country: Greece
- Administrative region: West Greece
- Regional unit: Elis
- Municipality: Andritsaina-Krestena

Area
  - Municipal unit: 96.678 km^{2} (37.328 sq mi)
- Elevation: 385 m (1,263 ft)

Population (2021)
  - Municipal unit: 1,189
  - Municipal unit density: 12.30/km^{2} (31.85/sq mi)
  - Community: 77
- Time zone: UTC+2 (EET)
  - Summer (DST): UTC+3 (EEST)
- Postal code: 270 62
- Area code: 26260
- Vehicle registration: ΗΑ

Alifeira (Greek: Αλίφειρα) is a mountain village and a former municipality in Elis, West Greece, Greece. Since the 2011 local government reform it is part of the municipality Andritsaina-Krestena, of which it is a municipal unit. The municipal unit has an area of 96.678 km^{2}. The seat of the municipality was in the village of Kallithea.

== Subdivisions ==
The municipal unit Alifeira is subdivided into the following communities (constituent villages in brackets):

- Alifeira (Alifeira, Pefki)
- Amygdalies (Amygdalies, Kato Amygdalies, Keramidi, Krana)
- Kallithea (Kallithea, Barakitika)
- Livadaki (Livadaki, Ptelea, Raptis)
- Myronia (Myronia, Sylimna, Agios Vlasis, Klima, Rama)
- Vresto (Vresto, Longo)

== Geography ==
Alifeira is situated in a mountainous and forested area, with many deep river valleys. The river Alfeios forms the northern border of the municipal unit. It is about 10 km northwest of Andritsaina, 20 km southeast of Krestena, 40 km southeast of Pyrgos and 50 km west of Tripoli. The Greek National Road 76 (Krestena - Karytaina - Megalopoli) runs through the municipal unit.

== History ==
The ancient Arcadian town Aliphera was located in the Parrhasia country, 40 stadia (about 8 km) from ancient Heraea. It took part in the colonization of Megalopolis in 371 BC and was member of the Arcadian League. The name originates from Alipheros, son of Lycaon. In the city there were sanctuaries of Athena and Asclepius. In 224 BC Lydiades, tyrant of Megalopolis, gave the town to the Eleans. It was taken by Philip V of Macedon in 219 BC after a long siege, and later it joined the Achaean League and minted its own currency. Later, the city was subject to the Romans.

The first excavations were done by Anastasios Orlandos in 1932. In the ancient city the temples of Athena and Asclepius, the acropolis, the cemetery wall and some buildings have been found.

== Historical population ==
Year	Alifeira community	Alifeira municipality
1991	-	3,169
2001	-	3,829
2011	96	2,008
2021	77	1,189

== See also ==
- List of settlements in Elis
