= Vrina, Greece =

Vrina Βρίνα
- Community
- Location within Greece
- Coordinates: 37°37′N 21°42′E
- Country: Greece
- Administrative region: West Greece
- Regional unit: Elis
- Municipality: Andritsaina-Krestena
- Municipal unit: Skillounta

Population (2021)
  - Community: 663
- Time zone: UTC+2 (EET)
  - Summer (DST): UTC+3 (EEST)

Vrina (Greek: Βρίνα) is a village in the municipal unit of Skillounta, Elis, Greece. Vrina is situated on a low hill, 3 km southeast of Krestena, 3 km southwest of Gryllos and 5 km east of Kato Samiko. Vrina suffered damage from the 2007 Greek forest fires. The village has an active cultural association.

== Population ==
Year	Population
1981	542
1991	501
2001	741
2011	721
2021	663

== See also ==
- List of settlements in Elis
