= Katsaros =

Katsaros Κατσαρός
- Community
- Location within Greece
- Coordinates: 37°43′19″N 21°25′01″E
- Country: Greece
- Administrative region: West Greece
- Regional unit: Elis
- Municipality: Pyrgos
- Municipal unit: Iardanos

Population (2021)
  - Community: 248
- Time zone: UTC+2 (EET)
  - Summer (DST): UTC+3 (EEST)

Katsaros (Greek: Κατσαρός) is a settlement in the municipal unit of Iardanos, Elis, Greece. It is situated at the foot of low hills, at 80 m elevation. It is 2 km southeast of Vounargo, 2 km southwest of Fonaitika and 6 km northwest of Pyrgos

== Population ==
Year	Population
1981	387
1991	362
2001	384
2011	310
2021	248

== See also ==
- List of settlements in Elis
