= Irakleia, Elis =

Irakleia Ηράκλεια
- Community
- Location within Greece
- Coordinates: 37°42′N 21°34′E
- Country: Greece
- Administrative region: West Greece
- Regional unit: Elis
- Municipality: Archaia Olympia
- Municipal unit: Archaia Olympia

Population (2021)
  - Community: 276
- Time zone: UTC+2 (EET)
  - Summer (DST): UTC+3 (EEST)

Irakleia (Greek: Ηράκλεια, before 1915: Μπρούμα - Brouma) is a village in the municipality of Ancient Olympia, Elis, Greece. Irakleia is located 3 km northwest of Pelopio, 6 km southeast of Karatoula, 7 km northwest of Olympia and 15 km northeast of Pyrgos.

== Population ==
Year	Population
1981	352
1991	343
2001	388
2011	272
2021	276

== History ==
Irakleia was named after Heracleia, a town of the ancient Eleans, located about 50 stadia (9 km) from Olympia and near the river Kytheros. It had a spring and a sanctuary of the Ionides: the nymphs Calliphaea, Synallasia, Pegaea and Iasis. It was believed that the spring water cured all sorts of aches and pains.

== See also ==
- List of settlements in Elis
