= Fonaitika =

Fonaitika Φοναΐτικα
- Community
- Location within Greece
- Coordinates: 37°44′N 21°26′E
- Country: Greece
- Administrative region: West Greece
- Regional unit: Elis
- Municipality: Pyrgos
- Municipal unit: Iardanos
- Elevation: 90 m (300 ft)

Population (2021)
  - Community: 98
- Time zone: UTC+2 (EET)
  - Summer (DST): UTC+3 (EEST)
- Vehicle registration: HA

Fonaitika (Greek: Φοναΐτικα) is a village in the municipal unit of Iardanos, Elis, Greece. It is situated at the foot of low hills, 2 km east of Vounargo, 2 km west of Vrochitsa, 2 km southwest of Koryfi and 8 km north of Pyrgos.

== Population ==
Year	Population
1981	159
1991	175
2001	149
2011	128
2021	98

== See also ==
- List of settlements in Elis
