= Achladini =

- Community
- Location within Greece
- Coordinates: 37°43′23″N 21°46′55″E
- Country: Greece
- Geographic region: Peloponnese
- Administrative region: Western Greece
- Regional unit: Elis
- Municipality: Archaia Olympia
- Municipal unit: Foloi

Population (2021)
  - Community: 193
- Time zone: UTC+2 (EET)
  - Summer (DST): UTC+3 (EEST)

Achladini is a village in the municipal unit of Foloi in the municipality of Archaia Olympia, Elis, Greece. Its population in 2021 was 193.

== See also ==
- List of settlements in Elis
