= Makrisia =

Makrisia Μακρίσια
- Community
- Location within Greece
- Coordinates: 37°37′N 21°36′E
- Country: Greece
- Administrative region: West Greece
- Regional unit: Elis
- Municipality: Andritsaina-Krestena
- Municipal unit: Skillounta

Population (2021)
  - Community: 1,584
- Time zone: UTC+2 (EET)
  - Summer (DST): UTC+3 (EEST)

Makrisia (Greek: Μακρίσια) is a village in the municipal unit of Skillounta, Elis, Greece. It is situated near the left bank of the river Alfeios, 2 km northwest of Krestena, 3 km northeast of Kallikomo, 4 km southwest of Olympia and 16 km southeast of Pyrgos.

== Population ==
Year	Population
1981	1,788
1991	2,158
2001	1,965
2011	1,720
2021	1,584

== See also ==
- List of settlements in Elis
