= Styllangium =

Coordinates: 37°34′52″N 21°40′17″E

Styllangium, Styllangion, or Stylangion (Ancient Greek: Στυλλάγγιον and Στυλλάγιον) was a town of Triphylia in ancient Elis.

Its site is tentatively located near modern Gryllos.
