= Vrochitsa =

Vrochitsa Βροχίτσα
- Community
- Location within Greece
- Coordinates: 37°44′N 21°27′E
- Country: Greece
- Administrative region: West Greece
- Regional unit: Elis
- Municipality: Pyrgos
- Municipal unit: Iardanos

Population (2021)
  - Community: 311
- Time zone: UTC+2 (EET)
  - Summer (DST): UTC+3 (EEST)

Vrochitsa (Greek: Βροχίτσα) is a settlement in the municipal unit of Iardanos, Greece. It is situated in a valley surrounded by low hills, at 80 m elevation. It is 2 km southwest of Elaionas, 2 km east of Fonaitika, 4 km east of Vounargo and 7 km north of Pyrgos. There is an elementary school, a church and a square.

== Population ==
Year	Population
1981	431
1991	408
2001	447
2011	359
2021	311

== See also ==
- List of settlements in Elis
