= Dafnoula =

Dafnoula Δαφνούλα
- Settlement
- Location within Greece
- Coordinates: 37°35′N 21°52′E
- Country: Greece
- Administrative region: West Greece
- Regional unit: Elis
- Municipality: Andritsaina-Krestena
- Municipal unit: Andritsaina
- Elevation: 178 m (584 ft)

Population (2021)
  - Community: 162
- Time zone: UTC+2 (EET)
  - Summer (DST): UTC+3 (EEST)
- Postal code: 270 62

Dafnoula (Greek: Δαφνούλα, meaning little laurel) is a community and a mountain village in Elis in Greece. It is part of the municipal unit Andritsaina. It is located in the hills on the left bank of the river Alfeios, about 12 km (7 mi) north of the town Andritsaina. The Alfeios forms the border with Arcadia to the north and east, the nearest village across the river is Agios Ioannis. The community Dafnoula includes the small village Chelidoni. Dafnoula has a small school, a church, and a small square.

== History ==
Ancient building remains were found to the west of Dafnoula, a thermal bath from the Roman imperial period and a building with an apse. In antiquity, there was a bridge over the Alfeios near the village, which, however, cannot be located exactly.

== Historical population ==
Year	Village population	Community population
1981	236	-
1991	230	-
2001	287	306
2011	127	133
2021	158	162

== Persons ==
- Ioannis G. Tsatsaris (born in 1934) is a Greek author

== See also ==
- List of settlements in Elis
