= Kafkonia =

Kafkonia Καυκωνία
- Community
- Location within Greece
- Coordinates: 37°41′N 21°37′E
- Country: Greece
- Administrative region: West Greece
- Regional unit: Elis
- Municipality: Archaia Olympia
- Municipal unit: Archaia Olympia

Population (2021)
  - Community: 147
- Time zone: UTC+2 (EET)
  - Summer (DST): UTC+3 (EEST)
- Postal code: 27060

Kafkonia (Greek: Καυκωνία) is a small village in the municipality of Ancient Olympia, Elis, Greece. It is located between the villages Pelopio and Chelidoni, 5 km north of Olympia. It is about 200m above sea level.
