= Kalyvakia =

Kalyvakia may refer to several places:

== In Cyprus ==
- Kalyvakia, Cyprus

== In Greece ==
- Kalyvakia, Arcadia, a village in Arcadia
- Kalyvakia, Elis, a village in Elis
- Kalyvakia, Karditsa, a village in the Karditsa regional unit
