= Scillus =

Coordinates: 37°36′34″N 21°36′10″E

Scillus or Skillous (Ancient Greek: Σκιλλοῦς) was a town of Triphylia, a district of ancient Elis, situated 20 stadia south of Olympia. In 572 BCE the Scilluntians assisted Pyrrhus, king of Pisa, in making war upon the Eleians; but they were completely conquered by the latter, and both Pisa and Scillus were razed to the ground. Scillus remained desolate till about 392 BCE, when the Lacedaemonians, who had a few years previously compelled the Eleians to renounce their supremacy over their dependent cities, colonised Scillus and gave it to Xenophon, then an exile from Athens. Xenophon resided here more than twenty years, and probably composed the Anabasis here, but was expelled from it by the Eleians soon after the Battle of Leuctra, in 371 BCE. He has left us a description of the place, which he says was situated 20 stadia (approximately 2 1/4 miles] from the Sacred Grove of Zeus, on the road to Olympia from Sparta, It stood upon the river Selinus, which was also the name of the river flowing by the temple of Artemis at Ephesus, and like the latter it abounded in fish and shell-fish. From a portion of the spoils he had acquired in the campaign he had joined against Artaxerxes II (recounted in his work The Anabasis), Xenophon dedicated a temple to Artemis, in imitation of the celebrated temple at Ephesus, and instituted a yearly festival to the goddess. Scillus stood amidst woods and meadows, and afforded abundant pasture for cattle; while the neighbouring mountains supplied wild hogs, roebucks, and stags. When Pausanias visited Scillus five centuries afterwards the temple of Artemis still remained, and a statue of Xenophon, made of Pentelic marble.

Scillus's site is near the modern village of Makrisia.

== See also ==
- Skillountia
