= Gryllos =

Gryllos Γρύλλος
- Community
- Location within Greece
- Coordinates: 37°35′N 21°40′E
- Country: Greece
- Administrative region: West Greece
- Regional unit: Elis
- Municipality: Andritsaina-Krestena
- Municipal unit: Skillounta

Population (2021)
  - Community: 277
- Time zone: UTC+2 (EET)
  - Summer (DST): UTC+3 (EEST)

Gryllos (Greek: Γρύλλος, before 1927: Μουνδράζα - Moundraza) is a village and a community in the municipal unit of Skillounta, Elis, Greece. The community includes the small village Chani Gryllou. It is 3 km northwest of Graikas, 3 km northeast of Vrina and 5 km southeast of Krestena. The Greek National Road 76 (Krestena - Andritsaina - Megalopoli) runs through Chani Gryllou. Gryllos suffered damage from the 2007 Greek forest fires.

== Population ==
Year	Population village	Community population
1981	374	-
1991	337	-
2001	309	450
2011	208	300
2021	212	277

== See also ==
- List of settlements in Elis
