= Krounoi =

Krounoi may refer to:

- Krounoi, Kallikomo, a village in Kallikomo, Greece
- Krounoi (Thrace), an ancient Greek colony in Thrace, now in Bulgaria
