= Vrina =

Vrina may refer to:

- Vrinë, a village in Markat municipality in Sarandë District, Albania
- Vrina, Greece, a village in Skillounta municipality in Elis, Greece
