= Doukas, Elis =

Doukas Δούκας
- Community
- Location within Greece
- Coordinates: 37°43′N 21°42′E
- Country: Greece
- Administrative region: West Greece
- Regional unit: Elis
- Municipality: Archaia Olympia
- Municipal unit: Foloi

Population (2021)
  - Community: 83
- Time zone: UTC+2 (EET)
  - Summer (DST): UTC+3 (EEST)

Doukas (Greek: Δούκας) is a mountain village and a community in the municipal unit of Foloi, Elis, Greece. The community includes the village Lasdikas. Situated at approximately 600 m above sea level, its climate is relatively cool during the summer and wet during the winter. Doukas is 2 km northwest of Lalas, 4 km east of Kryoneri and 11 km northeast of Olympia. The village was affected by the 2007 Greek forest fires.

== Population ==
Year	Village population	Community population
1981	-	311
1991	188	-
2001	106	191
2011	34	112
2021	31	83

== See also ==
- List of settlements in Elis
