= Heraclea (Elis) =

Coordinates: 37°41′15″N 21°34′25″E

Heraclea, Heracleia, or Herakleia (Ancient Greek: Ἡράκλεια) was a town of Pisatis in ancient Elis, distant 40 or 50 stadia from Olympia. It was but a village in the time of Pausanias. It contained medicinal waters issuing from a fountain sacred to the Ionic nymphs, and flowing into the neighbouring stream called Cytherus or Cytherius, which is the brook near the modern village of Irakleia (formerly called Brouma or Bruma).

The location of Heracleia is near the village of Irakleia.
