= Agios Georgios, Pyrgos =

Agios Georgios Άγιος Γεώργιος
- Community
- Location within Greece
- Coordinates: 37°42′N 21°26′E
- Country: Greece
- Administrative region: West Greece
- Regional unit: Elis
- Municipality: Pyrgos
- Municipal unit: Pyrgos
- Elevation: 25 m (82 ft)

Population (2021)
  - Community: 668
- Time zone: UTC+2 (EET)
  - Summer (DST): UTC+3 (EEST)
- Postal code: 271 00
- Area code: 26210

Agios Georgios (Greek: Άγιος Γεώργιος, named for Saint George) is a community in the municipality of Pyrgos, Elis, Greece. It is situated at the foot of low hills, 3 km north of the centre of Pyrgos, 2 km northeast of Lasteika and 2 km southeast of Prasino, in the municipal unit Iardanos. Settlement in the village started between 1900 and 1920. It has a soccer (football) club named Nikiforos.

== See also ==
- List of settlements in Elis
