= Platanos =

Platanos may refer to:

- Plantain, or the related fruit banana
- Platanos, Achaea, a village in Greece
- Platanos, Aetolia-Acarnania, a town in Greece
- Platanos, a figure in Greek mythology
- Platanos, Arcadia, a village in Greece
- Platanos, Crete, a village in Crete, Greece
- Platanos, Samos, a town on the island of Samos, Greece
- Platanos, Thessaly, a village in the municipality of Almyros, Magnesia, Thessaly, Greece
- Platanos, Elis, a village in Elis, Greece
- Plátanos, Buenos Aires, a town in the Berazategui Partido, Argentina
