= Prasino, Elis =

Prasino Πράσινο
- Community
- Location within Greece
- Coordinates: 37°42′54″N 21°25′26″E
- Country: Greece
- Administrative region: West Greece
- Regional unit: Elis
- Municipality: Pyrgos
- Municipal unit: Iardanos

Population (2021)
  - Community: 710
- Time zone: UTC+2 (EET)
  - Summer (DST): UTC+3 (EEST)

Prasino (Greek: Πράσινο) is a village and a community in the municipal unit of Iardanos, Elis, Greece. It is 2 km northwest of Agios Georgios, 3 km southeast of Vounargo and 5 km northwest of Pyrgos town centre. The community consists of the villages Prasino, Glykorizo and Keramidia. Its elevation is 70 m.

== Population ==
Year	Population village	Population community
1981	626	-
1991	495	-
2001	519	828
2011	486	718
2021	373	710

== See also ==
- List of settlements in Elis
