= Platanos, Elis =

Platanos Πλάτανος
- Community
- Location within Greece
- Coordinates: 37°40′N 21°37′E
- Country: Greece
- Administrative region: West Greece
- Regional unit: Elis
- Municipality: Archaia Olympia
- Municipal unit: Archaia Olympia

Population (2021)
  - Community: 763
- Time zone: UTC+2 (EET)
  - Summer (DST): UTC+3 (EEST)

Platanos (Greek: Πλάτανος meaning plane tree) is a village and a community in the municipality of Ancient Olympia, Elis, Greece. It is located north of the Alfeios valley, 2 km southeast of Pelopio, 3 km northwest of Olympia and 15 km east of Pyrgos. The Greek National Road 74 (Pyrgos - Tripoli) passes south of Platanos. The community includes the small village Agios Georgios.

== Population ==
Year	Village population	Community population
1981	1,185	-
1991	1,192	-
2001	1,583	1,590
2011	766	780
2021	740	763

== See also ==
- List of settlements in Elis
