= Smila, Greece =

Smila Σμίλα
- Community
- Location within Greece
- Coordinates: 37°41′N 21°33′E
- Country: Greece
- Administrative region: West Greece
- Regional unit: Elis
- Municipality: Archaia Olympia
- Municipal unit: Archaia Olympia
- Elevation: 60 m (200 ft)

Population (2021)
  - Community: 307
- Time zone: UTC+2 (EET)
  - Summer (DST): UTC+3 (EEST)

Smila (Greek: Σμίλα) is a village and a community in the municipality of Olympia, Elis, Greece. It is situated in the plains north of the river Alfeios, 1 km north of Strefi, 3 km west of Pelopio, 7 km northwest of Olympia and 10 km east of Pyrgos. The community includes the small village Karoutes.

The myth says that the village was called Smila because Praxiteles (the artist who made the famous statue of Hermes), lost his chisel (Greek: σμίλη) here. Many ancient artifacts have been found in this village, especially in the northern part. They are exhibited in the Archaeological Museum of Olympia. A great cheesemaking tradition has been established in Smila over the past few years, and several well known cheesemakers have been born in Smila, some of whom have found extensive occupation as ship chefs. Smila suffered damage from the 2007 Greek forest fires.

== Population ==
| Year | Village population | Community population |
|---|---|---|
| 1981 | 484 | - |
| 1991 | 528 | - |
| 2001 | 453 | 522 |
| 2011 | 341 | 390 |
| 2021 | 256 | 307 |

== See also ==
- List of settlements in Elis
