= Vyronas Davos =

Greek historian, writer and poet

Vyronas Davos (Greek: Βύρων Δάβος; born 1927), is a Greek historian, writer and poet. He was born in the village of Pelopio (now part of the municipality of Olympia) in Elis and moved to Athens as an employee of the fire department. Davos was a member of the Hellenic or Greek Literature Company and the Greek Literature Union. His literature of the same is made known to the cultural ministry.

== Bibliography ==
He wrote several historic and poetic works. His most popular include:

Year	Title	English title	Category
1945	Χρόνοι σκλαβιάς	Slavery Times	-
1951	Ήρθαν τα χελιδόνια	Here Comes The Turtle	-
1957	Μακρυνές αγάπες	Everlasting Love	-
1959	Ήχοι και αντίλαλοι	-	-
1971	Η μεγάλη επιστροφή	The Big Return	-
1974	Η ιστορία του χωριού μου Όσα γράφει η μοίρα	History Of My Town -	- -
1995	Ιστορία του Πύργου Ηλείας	History of Pyrgos, Elis	historical
1996	Στον Πύργο και στην Ηλεία του 1821-1930	In Pyrgos and in Elis (1821-1930)	historical
1997	Η ιστορία της πυροσβεστικής υπηρεσίας 1830-1980 η Ηλεία πρίν την επανάσταση του 1821 η ζωή των κατοίκων της Ηλείας κατα την τουρκοκρατία Τα σταφιδικά της Ηλείας	History Of The Fire Department (1830-1980); Elis Before The Revolution of 1821; The Life Of The Inhabitants Of Elis During The Turkish Rule -	historical historical historical -
-	Τοπονύμια της Ηλείας	Toponyms of Elis	
-	Φωνες απ'τ'άστρα	-	-

He also wrote several articles in newspapers of Elis including Patris, Avgi, etc.
