= Foloi =

Foloi Φολόη
- Municipal unit
- Location within the regional unit

- Location within Greece
- Coordinates: 37°47′N 21°43′E
- Country: Greece
- Administrative region: West Greece
- Regional unit: Elis
- Municipality: Archaia Olympia

Area
  - Municipal unit: 174.2 km^{2} (67.3 sq mi)
- Elevation: 640 m (2,100 ft)

Population (2021)
  - Municipal unit: 2,293
  - Municipal unit density: 13.16/km^{2} (34.09/sq mi)
  - Community: 156
- Time zone: UTC+2 (EET)
  - Summer (DST): UTC+3 (EEST)
- Postal code: 270 66
- Area code: 26240
- Vehicle registration: ΗΑ

Foloi (Greek: Φολόη, Latin: Pholoe) is a village and a former municipality in Elis, West Greece, Greece. Since the 2011 local government reform it is part of the municipality Archaia Olympia, of which it is a municipal unit. The municipal unit has an area of 174.202 km^{2}. The seat of the municipality was in the village Lalas, in the southern part of the municipal unit. The village Foloi is situated in the northwestern part. Foloi is situated in a mountainous, sparsely populated area. The Foloi oak forest is located in the municipal unit. Foloi is located about 15 km northeast of Olympia, 30 km east of Pyrgos and 55 km south of Patras. It borders on Arcadia to the east, across the river Erymanthus.

== History ==
The village, formerly named Giarmena (Greek: Γιάρμενα), was renamed in 1928 after an ancient name related to the centaur Pholus.

== Subdivisions ==
The municipal unit Foloi is subdivided into the following communities (constituent villages in brackets):

- Achladini (Achladini, Koutsouroumpas)
- Doukas (Doukas, Lasdikas)
- Foloi
- Koumanis (Koumanis, Ai Giannaki, Kastania)
- Lalas (Lalas, Pothos)
- Milies
- Nemouta (Nemouta, Kampos, Tsaparaiika, Villia)
- Neraida (Neraida, Kampos)
- Persaina (Nea Persaina)

== Historical population ==
Year	Community Foloi	Municipal unit Foloi
1981	308	-
1991	253	3,826
2001	333	4,870
2011	208	2,969
2021	156	2,293

== See also ==
- List of settlements in Elis
