= Koryfi, Elis =

Koryfi Κορυφή
- Community
- Location within Greece
- Coordinates: 37°46′N 21°26′E
- Country: Greece
- Administrative region: West Greece
- Regional unit: Elis
- Municipality: Pyrgos
- Municipal unit: Iardanos

Population (2021)
  - Community: 124
- Time zone: UTC+2 (EET)
  - Summer (DST): UTC+3 (EEST)

Koryfi (Greek: Κορυφή meaning "pointy", before 1955: Κουκουβίτσα - Koukouvitsa) is a settlement in the municipal unit of Iardanos, Elis, Greece. The former name of the village, Koukouvitsa, is the Bulgarian word for the bird cuckoo. Koryfi is situated in a hilly area, at 290 m elevation. It is 4 km northeast of Vounargo, 6 km southwest of Peristeri, 9 km southeast of Amaliada and 10 km north of Pyrgos. The community includes the monastery Fragkopidima.

Fortress of Koukouvitsa (Κάστρο Κουκουβίτσας), built without bricks, but form well formed big stone blocks as bulgarian medieval fortresses, is located about 2.5 km north of the community.

== Population ==
Year	Population village	Population community
1981	180	-
1991	178	-
2001	276	301
2011	223	246
2021	117	124

== See also ==
- List of settlements in Elis
