= Kato Samiko =

Kato Samiko Κάτω Σαμικό
- Community
- Location within Greece
- Coordinates: 37°33′N 21°36′E
- Country: Greece
- Administrative region: West Greece
- Regional unit: Elis
- Municipality: Andritsaina-Krestena
- Municipal unit: Skillounta

Population (2021)
  - Community: 329
- Time zone: UTC+2 (EET)
  - Summer (DST): UTC+3 (EEST)

Kato Samiko (Greek: Κάτω Σαμικό, meaning "lower Samiko") is a village and a community in the municipal unit of Skillounta, Elis, Greece. It is situated 2 km from the Ionian Sea, 3 km southeast of Samiko, 6 km southwest of Krestena, 8 km northwest of Zacharo and 20 km southeast of Pyrgos. The community includes the small villages Kleidi and Fragkokklisia. The Greek National Road 9 (E55, Patras - Pyrgos - Kyparissia) and the railway from Pyrgos to Kalamata run through the village. Kato Samiko suffered damage from the 2007 Greek forest fires. The ruins of ancient Samicum lie within the borders of the municipal unit.

== Population ==
Year	Settlement population	Population community
1981	416	-
1991	515	-
2001	475	531
2011	428	494
2021	271	329

== See also ==
- List of settlements in Elis
