= Ioannis G. Tsatsaris =

Greek writer (1934-2022)

Ioannis G. Tsatsaris (Greek: Ιωάννης Γ. Τσάτσαρης; 1934, Dafnoula – 2022) was a Greek writer. He wrote many books on the paranormal and the nature of spirituality, including True stories of para-natural phenomena from Mount Pindos; The Revelation after Ioannis; The Next Step of Creation — The Revelation; and Man on his Unknown Path — The Apocalypse. He claimed to be inspired by "Higher Positions of the Universes", which provide him with unique insight into the subject matter of his books.

Several people who met him have stated on camera that he was a person with special knowledge and capabilities. None of them mentioned that he ever asked for money (or other material benefits) for the help he provided to others.
