= Kladeos, Elis =

Community in Elis, Greece

Kladeos Κλάδεος
- Community
- Location within Greece
- Coordinates: 37°40′41″N 21°38′53″E
- Country: Greece
- Administrative region: Western Greece
- Regional unit: Elis
- Municipality: Archaia Olympia
- Municipal unit: Archaia Olympia

Population (2021)
  - Community: 125
- Time zone: UTC+2 (EET)
  - Summer (DST): UTC+3 (EEST)

Kladeos is a community in Elis in Greece. It is part of the municipality of Olympia. It is 4 km northeast of Olympia and 5 km south of Kryoneri.
