= Alpochori, Elis =

Alpochori Αλποχώρι
- Community
- Location within Greece
- Coordinates: 37°44′N 21°22′E
- Country: Greece
- Administrative region: West Greece
- Regional unit: Elis
- Municipality: Pyrgos
- Municipal unit: Iardanos

Population (2021)
  - Community: 683
- Time zone: UTC+2 (EET)
  - Summer (DST): UTC+3 (EEST)

Alpochori (Greek: Αλποχώρι), is a village and a community in the municipal unit of Iardanos, Elis, Greece. Alpochori is situated on a low hill, 3 km west of Vounargo, 9 km northwest of Pyrgos and 7 km southeast of Amaliada. The Greek National Road 9 (Patras - Pyrgos) passes west of the village.

== Population ==
Year	Village population	Community population
1981	-	819
1991	240	-
2001	244	890
2011	216	720
2021	197	683

== Community ==
The community of Alpochori consists of three villages: Alpochóri (Αλποχώρι, 197 inhabitants in 2021), Kapandríti (Καπανδρίτι, 50 inhabitants) and Chanákia (Χανάκια, 436 inhabitants).

== Sports ==
In 1978, the football (soccer) club Aetos Alpochori was founded. It presently plays in the second division of the local championship. The team plays in its field which is named Tsaouseio and is named after Dionysios Tsaousis, who donated the field to the community.

== See also ==
- List of settlements in Elis
