= Koskinas =

Koskinas Κοσκινάς
- Community
- Location within Greece
- Coordinates: 37°39′25″N 21°37′55″E
- Country: Greece
- Administrative region: Western Greece
- Regional unit: Elis
- Municipality: Archaia Olympia
- Municipal unit: Archaia Olympia

Population (2021)
  - Community: 180
- Time zone: UTC+2 (EET)
  - Summer (DST): UTC+3 (EEST)

Koskinas (Greek: Κοσκινάς) is a village in the municipality of Olympia, Elis, Greece. It is 1.5 km northeast of Olympia.
