= Xenies =

Xenies Ξενιές
- Community
- Location within Greece
- Coordinates: 37°55′N 21°30′E
- Country: Greece
- Administrative region: West Greece
- Regional unit: Elis
- Municipality: Andravida-Kyllini
- Municipal unit: Vouprasia

Population (2021)
  - Community: 60
- Time zone: UTC+2 (EET)
  - Summer (DST): UTC+3 (EEST)

Xenies (Greek: Ξενιές) is a village and a community in the municipal unit of Vouprasia, Elis, southwestern Greece. The community includes the small villages Kalyvakia and Palaiochora. Xenies is situated in the hills on the northeastern shore of the Pineios reservoir.

== Population ==
Historical population
Year	Pop.	±%
2001	110	—
2011	176	+60.0%
2021	60	−65.9%

== See also ==
- List of settlements in Elis
