= Samicum =

Town of Triphylia in ancient Elis

Coordinates: 37°32′02″N 21°35′55″E

Samicum or Samikon (Ancient Greek: Σαμικόν) was a town of Triphylia in ancient Elis, situated near the coast about half-way between the mouths of the Alpheius and the Neda, and a little north of the Anigrus. It stood upon a projecting spur of a lofty mountain, which here approaches so near the coast as to leave only a narrow pass.

== History ==
From its situation commanding this pass, it is probable that a city existed here from the earliest times; and it was therefore identified with the Arene of Homer, which the poet places near the mouth of the Minyeius, a river supposed to be the same as the Anigrus. According to Strabo the city was originally called Samos (Σάμος), from its being situated upon a hill, because this word formerly signified "heights"; Samicum was at first the name of the fortress, and the same name was also given to the surrounding plain. Pausanias speaks of a city Samia (Σαμία), which he apparently distinguishes from Samicum; but Samicum is the only place mentioned in history.

Samicum was occupied by the Aetolian Polysperchon against the Arcadians, and was taken by Philip V of Macedon in 219 BCE.

Near Samicum upon the coast was a celebrated temple of the Samian Poseidon, surrounded by a grove of wild olives. It was the centre of the religious worship of the six Triphylian cities, all of whom contributed to its support. It was under the superintendence of Macistus, the most powerful of the Triphylian cities. In a corrupt passage of Strabo this temple is said to be 100 stadia equidistant from Lepreum and the "Annius" (τοῦ Ἀννίου); for the latter name we ought to read Alpheius and not Anigrus, as some editors have done.

In the neighbourhood of Samicum there were celebrated medicinal springs, which were said to cure cutaneous diseases. Of the two lagoons which now stretch along the coast, the larger, which extends as far as the mouth of the Alpheius, begins at the northern foot of the hill upon which Samicum stands; the southern extends along the precipitous sides of the hill, which were called in antiquity the Achaean rocks. The river Anigrus flows into the latter of these lagoons, and from thence flows out into the sea. The lagoon is deep, being fed with subterraneous sources; in summer it is said to be very fetid, and the air extremely unwholesome. Strabo relates that the waters of the lake were fetid, and its fish not eatable, which he attributes to the Centaurs washing their wounds in the Anigrus. Pausanias mentions the same circumstances; and both writers describe the efficacy of the water in curing cutaneous diseases. There were two caves, one sacred to the Nymphs Anigrides, and the other to the Atlantides; the former was the more important, and is alone mentioned by Pausanias. It was in the cave of the Anigrides that the persons who were going to use the waters first offered up their prayers to the Nymphs. These two caves are still visible in the rocks; but they are now accessible only by a boat, as they are immediately above the surface of the lake. General Gordon, who visited these caverns in 1835, found in one of them water distilling from the rock, and bringing with it a pure yellow sulphur.

== Modern location ==
The ruins of Samicum are found at Kleidi Hill near Kato Samiko. The ruined walls are 6 feet (2 m) thick, and about 1.5 miles (2.4 km) in circumference. They are of the second order of Hellenic masonry, and are evidently of great antiquity. The towers towards the sea belong to a later age.

== Archaeology ==
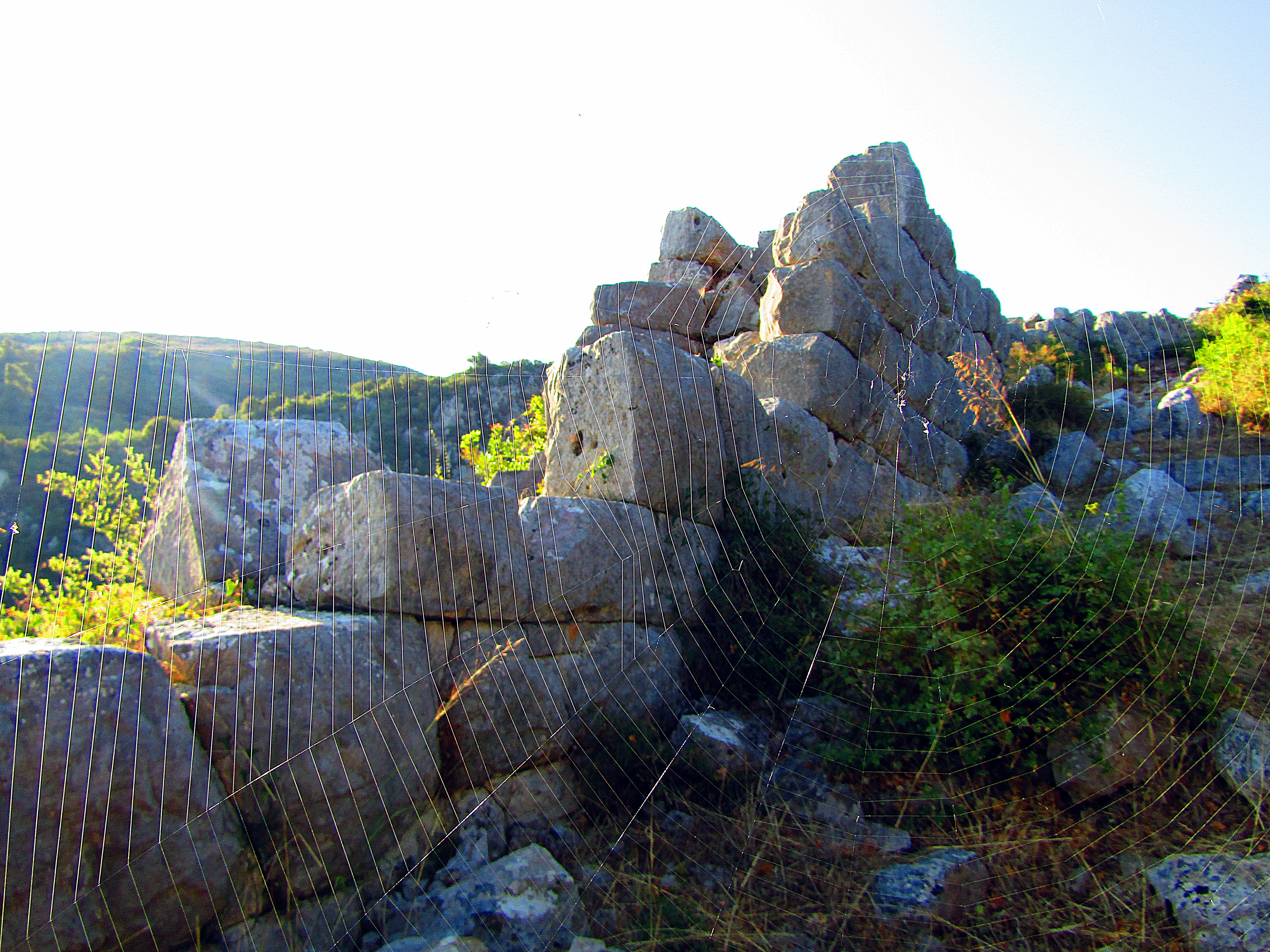
Remains of the walls of the ancient city.

The remains found on Kleidi Hill include cyclopean walls and remnants of a settlement that was occupied in the middle and late Helladic periods. To these periods there is also an extensive necropolis where rich grave goods have been brought to light. A large tumulus containing numerous tombs, excavated in 1954 by Nikos Yaluris, has been given the name of "Iardanus's Tomb" due to the passage of Strabo that mentions the existence of the tomb of that character in this place. In the Classical acropolis, pottery from the late Helladic period III has also been found, probably belonging to a guard tower that must have been there.

To the east of this hill is Elliniko Hill, where the Classical acropolis was, which was used since the 4th century BCE until Roman times. To the north of the classical acropolis are the remains of Roman baths and a Paleo-Christian temple. In medieval times, Kleidi Hill was also fortified.

In 2023, archaeologists discovered the remains of an early temple-like structure that was located within the site of the sanctuary of Poseidon and was quite possibly dedicated to the god.
