= Kallikomo =

Kallikomo Καλλίκωμο
- Community
- Location within Greece
- Coordinates: 37°35′N 21°35′E
- Country: Greece
- Administrative region: West Greece
- Regional unit: Elis
- Municipality: Andritsaina-Krestena
- Municipal unit: Skillounta
- Elevation: 66 m (217 ft)

Population (2021)
  - Community: 951
- Time zone: UTC+2 (EET)
  - Summer (DST): UTC+3 (EEST)

Kallikomo (Greek: Καλλίκωμο) is a village and a community in the municipal unit of Skillounta, Elis, Greece. It is situated 5 km from the Ionian Sea, 3 km west of Krestena, 5 km north of Kato Samiko and 16 km southeast of Pyrgos. The EO9 road, currently part of European route E55 in the area, runs through the village. The junction with the Greek National Road 76 to Krestena and Megalopoli is 1 km east of the village. The community consists of the villages Kallikomo, Krounoi and Ladiko.

== Historical population ==
Year	Village population	Community population
1981	1,080	-
1991	1,003	-
2001	1,203	1,318
2011	1,008	1,105
2021	838	951

== History ==
The village Kallikomo is a planned town, built around 1970 by the army in order to house the inhabitants of the villages Krounoi and Ladiko, that had been destroyed by an earthquake in 1965. In 2001, Ladiko was completely deserted and Krounoi had only 105 inhabitants. The only intact building that remains in Ladiko is the church of St. Demetrius. Krounoi has a church dedicated to St. Panteleimon. Ladiko and Krounoi have no municipal building of their own today, being assigned to the one in Kallikomo.

On March 26, 2002, pilot Pantelis Karantalis was hailed as a hero by the population of Kallikomo for managing to steer his crashing A-7 Corsair bomber away from the village before bailing out.

== See also ==
- List of settlements in Elis
