= Kryoneri, Olympia =

Kryoneri Κρυονέρι
- Community
- Location within Greece
- Coordinates: 37°43′N 21°39′E
- Country: Greece
- Administrative region: West Greece
- Regional unit: Elis
- Municipality: Archaia Olympia
- Municipal unit: Archaia Olympia
- Elevation: 500 m (1,600 ft)

Population (2021)
  - Community: 144
- Time zone: UTC+2 (EET)
  - Summer (DST): UTC+3 (EEST)

Kryoneri (Greek: Κρυονέρι, before 1928: Μπάστα - Basta) is a little village near Olympia, Elis, Greece. It is situated on the southwestern edge of the Foloi oak forest. It is 2 km south of Neraida, 4 km west of Doukas, 3 km east of Chelidoni and 9 km northeast of Olympia.

== Population ==
Year	Village population
1981	210
1991	225
2001	264
2011	139
2021	144

== History ==
The old name for Kryoneri, Basta (still used in the region), is Italian. The Venetians planted olives, and built the partially finished Venetian castle in Kionia.

The Black Death (1347–1350), along with malaria, devastated much of Elis' population. All inhabitants of the villages Basta, Kaloletsi (now Neraida) and Milies had died. After the plague 10,000 Orthodox Christian Albanians settled in the area, invited by Despot of the Morea Manuel Kantakouzenos. Until the beginning of the 20th century, the people from Basta spoke both Greek and Arvanitika. In 1928 the name of the village was changed to the present Kryoneri ("cold water"), a signal that Arvanitika was no longer widely spoken. The children of Basta no longer learn or speak Albanian.

Between 1836 and 1912, it was a part of the municipality of Oleni within the Elis prefecture. Between 1912 and 1932 it was part of the independent community Chelidoni. Basta was renamed to Kryoneri in 1928. In 1932, Kryoneri became an independent community. Kryoneri was renamed to Monastiri in 1940, but this was reverted in 1953. Since 1998 Kryoneri is part of the municipality Archaia Olympia.

== See also ==
- List of settlements in Elis
