= Chelidoni =

Chelidoni Χελιδόνι
- Community
- Location within Greece
- Coordinates: 37°43′N 21°37′E
- Country: Greece
- Administrative region: West Greece
- Regional unit: Elis
- Municipality: Archaia Olympia
- Municipal unit: Archaia Olympia
- Elevation: 360 m (1,180 ft)

Population (2021)
  - Community: 376
- Time zone: UTC+2 (EET)
  - Summer (DST): UTC+3 (EEST)

Chelidoni (Greek: Χελιδόνι) is a village and a community in the municipality of Ancient Olympia, Elis, Greece. It is located in the southwestern foothills of the Foloi plateau, 3 km west of Kryoneri, 8 km north of Olympia and 17 km east of Pyrgos. The village suffered damage from the 2007 Greek forest fires.

== Population ==
Year	Population
1981	653
1991	662
2001	676
2011	550
2021	376

== See also ==
- List of settlements in Elis
