= Iardanos =

Iardanos Ιάρδανος
- Municipal unit
- Location within the regional unit

- Location within Greece
- Coordinates: 37°44′N 21°24′E
- Country: Greece
- Administrative region: West Greece
- Regional unit: Elis
- Municipality: Pyrgos

Area
  - Municipal unit: 62.723 km^{2} (24.217 sq mi)
- Elevation: 6 m (20 ft)

Population (2021)
  - Municipal unit: 3,274
  - Municipal unit density: 52.20/km^{2} (135.2/sq mi)
- Time zone: UTC+2 (EET)
  - Summer (DST): UTC+3 (EEST)
- Postal code: 271 00
- Area code: 26210
- Vehicle registration: ΗΑ

Iardanos (Greek: Ιάρδανος) is a former municipality in Elis, West Greece, Greece. Since the 2011 local government reform it is part of the municipality Pyrgos, of which it is a municipal unit. The municipal unit has an area of 62.723 km^{2}. Its seat of administration was the village Vounargo. Iardanos is enclosed by the municipal units of Amaliada to the north, and Pyrgos to the south.

== Subdivisions ==
The municipal unit Iardanos is subdivided into the following communities (constituent villages in brackets):

- Agioi Apostoloi
- Alpochori (Alpochori, Chanakia, Kapandriti)
- Fonaitika
- Katsaros
- Koryfi (Koryfi, Moni Fragkopidimatos)
- Prasino (Prasino, Glykorizo, Keramidia)
- Vounargo
- Vrochitsa
- Xylokera

== Historical population ==
Year	Population
1991	4,103
2001	4,016
2011	3,673
2021	3,274

== See also ==
- List of settlements in Elis
