= Pelopio =

Pelopio Πελόπιο
- Community
- Location within Greece
- Coordinates: 37°40′N 21°35′E
- Country: Greece
- Administrative region: West Greece
- Regional unit: Elis
- Municipality: Archaia Olympia
- Municipal unit: Archaia Olympia

Population (2021)
  - Community: 944
- Time zone: UTC+2 (EET)
  - Summer (DST): UTC+3 (EEST)

Pelopio (Greek: Πελόπιο, before 1928: Κριεκούκι - Kriekouki) is a settlement in the municipality of Ancient Olympia, Elis, Greece. Pelopio is 3 km east of Smila, 4 km northwest of Olympia and 5 km southwest of Chelidoni. The Greek National Road 74 (Pyrgos - Tripoli) passes south of the village.

== History ==
The village was founded in the 15th century during the Ottoman rule. It was founded by Turkish-Albanians who named it originally "Kriekouki" which means "red head" in their language. In 1928 it was renamed to Pelopio after Pelops, the mythical king of Pisa. Pelopio suffered damage from the 2007 Greek forest fires and from a tornado on 3 November 2009.

== Population ==
Year	Population
1981	924
1991	1,023
2001	1,057
2011	976
2021	944

== Persons ==
- Vyron Davos, writer, mainly wrote about Elis and its history

== See also ==
- List of settlements in Elis
