= Greek National Road 76 =

Trunk road in Greece

National Road 76
- Εθνική Οδός 76
- Route of the EO76 road, in blue

Route information
- Length: 57.9 km (36.0 mi)
- Existed: 9 July 1963–present

Major junctions
- East end: Megalopolis
- West end: Temple of Apollo Epicurius

Location
- Country: Greece
- Regions: Peloponnese; Western Greece
- Primary destinations: Megalopolis; Andritsaina; Temple of Apollo Epicurius

Highway system
- Highways in Greece; Motorways; National roads
← EO75	→ EO77

National Road 76 (Greek: Εθνική Οδός 76), abbreviated as the EO76, is a national road in the Peloponnese and Western Greece regions of Greece. The EO76 runs between Megalopolis and the Temple of Apollo Epicurius.

== Route ==
The EO76 is officially defined as an east–west road located the Arcadia, Elis and Messenia regional units: the EO76 branches off the EO7 in Megalopolis (Arcadia), and heads west towards the Temple of Apollo Epicurius (Messenia), passing through Andritsaina (Elis).

== History ==
Ministerial Decision G25871 of 9 July 1963 created the EO76 from the old EO58, which existed by royal decree from 1955 until 1963, and followed the same route as the current EO76.
