= Olympia, Greece =

Town in Elis, Greece

Olympia Ολυμπία
- Municipality
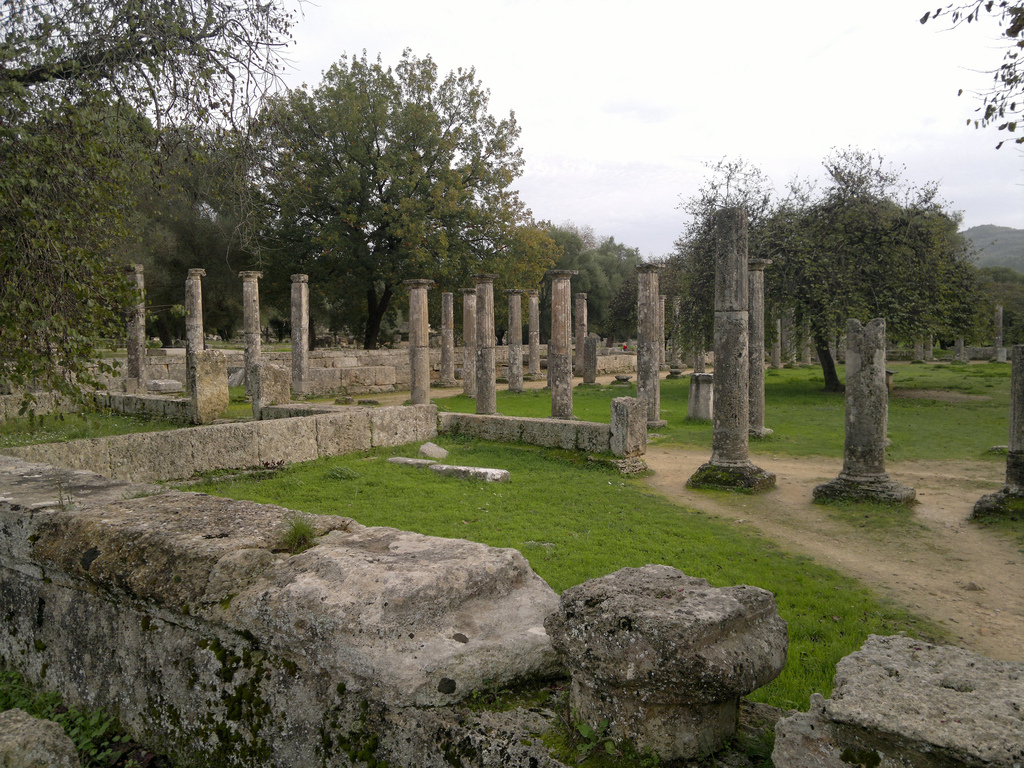
- View of the Palestra, a center for wrestling

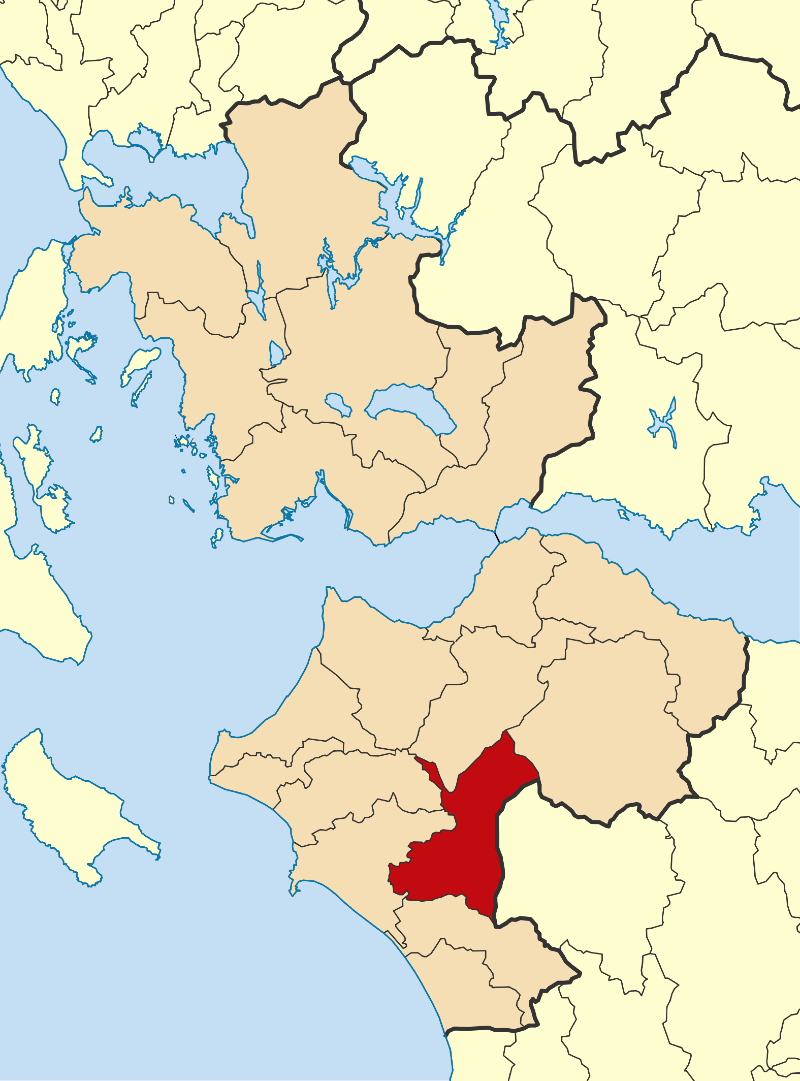

- Location within Greece
- Coordinates: 37°38′18″N 21°37′48″E
- Country: Greece
- Geographic region: Peloponnese
- Administrative region: Western Greece
- Regional unit: Elis

Area
  - Municipality: 545.1 km^{2} (210.5 sq mi)
  - Municipal unit: 178.9 km^{2} (69.1 sq mi)
- Elevation: 60 m (200 ft)

Population (2021)
  - Municipality: 11,153
  - Density: 20.46/km^{2} (52.99/sq mi)
  - Municipal unit: 6,859
  - Municipal unit density: 38.34/km^{2} (99.30/sq mi)
  - Community: 882
- Time zone: UTC+2 (EET)
  - Summer (DST): UTC+3 (EEST)
- Postal code: 2708 25
- Area code: 26240

UNESCO World Heritage Site
- Official name: Archaeological Site of Olympia
- Criteria: Cultural: i, ii, iii, iv, vi
- Reference: 517
- Inscription: 1989 (13th Session)
- Area: 105.6 ha (261 acres)
- Buffer zone: 1,458.18 ha (3,603.2 acres)

Olympia (Modern Greek: Ολυμπία [oli(m)ˈbi.a]; Ancient Greek: Ὀλυμπία [olympí.aː]), officially Archaia Olympia (Greek: Αρχαία Ολυμπία lit. 'Ancient Olympia'), is a small town in Elis on the Peloponnese peninsula in Greece, famous for the nearby archaeological site of the same name. The site was a major Panhellenic religious sanctuary of ancient Greece, where the ancient Olympic Games were held every four years throughout classical antiquity, from the 8th century BC to the 4th century AD. They were restored on a global basis in 1894 in honor of the ideal of peaceful international contention for excellence.

The sacred precinct, named the Altis, was primarily dedicated to Zeus, although other gods were worshipped there. The games conducted in his name drew visitors from all over the Greek world as one of a group of such "Panhellenic" centres, which helped to build the identity of the ancient Greeks as a nation. Despite the name, it is nowhere near Mount Olympus in northern Greece, where the twelve Olympians, the major deities of ancient Greek religion, were believed to live.

Ancient history records that Pisa and Elis, other villages in the region, contended with Olympia for management of the precinct, and that Olympia won, implying that the village was not identical to the precinct. The putative location of the ancient village is the modern village, which appears to have been inhabited continuously since ancient times.

The archaeological site held over 760 significant buildings, and ruins of many of these survive.

Of special interest to Greeks is the Pelopion, tomb of the quasi-mythical king Pelops, who gives his name to the Peloponnese and was ancestor of Agamemnon and Menelaus, the Greek kings of the Trojan War. (Note: This mythical line is Zeus→ Tantalus→ Pelops→ Atreus→ Agamemnon and Menelaus. The Greeks of the times identified the place as the burial site of Pelops, ruler of the Peloponnese. If Agamemnon was real, and was the master of archaeological Mycenae, enemy of archaeological Troy, ally of archaeological Pylos and archaeological Sparta, then Pelops, his grandfather, must have been a king in Mycenaean times. If the mythical line was compressed, Pelops may have been indefinitely earlier, unless he was entirely mythical.) The tomb suggests that he may not have been entirely mythical.

Another location that has a special interest to both ancients and moderns is the stadium. It is basically a field with start and end lines marked off by transverse curbing. The athletes entered under an archway of a vaulted corridor at the start. Spectators sat mainly on the field's sloping flanks. The length of this field became the standard stadion, an ancient Greek unit of distance, which appears in all the geographers. (Note: This unit is more difficult to measure today. There were at least 3 stadiums, termed Stadium I, II, and III. The one remaining is III. One stadion was defined as 600 podes, one pous being the ancient Greek "foot." The length of the foot determined the length of the stadium, but standard feet varied both by intention and accidentally. Stadium III had a length of 192.27 m (210.27 yd), which implied a pous of 320.45 mm, close to the 324 of the doric order of architecture. The Doric stadion might therefore be regarded as the original Greek, which seems to have been built on the Luwian pous of 323 mm.) The stadium has been resurrected for Olympic use with no intentional alteration of the ancient topography. Temporary stands are easily erected and dismantled.

The first major games at the Olympia stadium were said to have taken place in the 720s BCE. These prestigious ancient games were held during the festival of Zeus. Olympia was a sanctuary, but it was within the independent state of Elis, and since the Eleans managed the games, there was sometimes bias. The famous Olympic truce only mandated safe passage for visitors and did not stop all wars in Greece or even at Olympia.

The village services the adjacent archaeological site to the southeast. The Kladeos River forms the site's western border. Visitors walk over the bridge to find themselves in front of the main gate. Visiting the full site requires extensive walking. Excavations are often in progress there. Moveable artifacts from the site are mostly housed in one of the site's three museums.

== Ancient site ==
Olympia among the main Greek sanctuaries

=== Architectural summary ===
Olympia lies in the valley of the Alfeiós River (also Anglicized as Alpheus or Alpheios) in the western part of the Peloponnese, today around 18 km (11 mi) from the Gulf of Kyparissia in the Ionian Sea, but in antiquity perhaps half that distance. (Note: "In earlier times, Olympia was not 22 kilometers away from the sea as it is today. Back then, the coastline was located eight or perhaps even more kilometers further inland ..." Professor Dr Andreas Vött of the Institute of Geography of Johannes Gutenberg University Mainz, Germany.)

According to Pausanias, there were over 70 temples in total, as well as treasuries, altars, statues, and other structures dedicated to many deities. Somewhat in contrast to Delphi, where a similar large collection of monuments were tightly packed within the temenos boundary, Olympia sprawled beyond the boundary wall, especially in the areas devoted to the games.

To the north of the sanctuary can be found the Prytaneion and the Philippeion, as well as the array of treasuries representing the various city-states. The Metroon lies to the south of these treasuries, with the Echo Stoa to the east. The hippodrome and later stadium were located east of the Echo Stoa. To the south of the sanctuary is the South Stoa and the bouleuterion, whereas the palaestra, the workshop of Pheidias, the gymnasion, and the Leonidaion lie to the west.

Olympia was also known for the gigantic chryselephantine (ivory and gold on a wooden frame) statue of Zeus that was the cult image in his temple, sculpted by Pheidias, which was named one of the Seven Wonders of the Ancient World by Antipater of Sidon. Very close to the Temple of Zeus which housed this statue, the studio of Pheidias was excavated in the 1950s. Evidence found there, such as sculptor's tools, corroborates this opinion. The ancient ruins sit north of the Alpheios River and south of Mount Kronos (named after the Greek deity Kronos). The Kladeos, a tributary of the Alpheios, borders the west.

=== Site plan ===

Legend
1.	Northwest Propylon	12.	Building of Ptolemy II and Arsinoe II	23.	Heroon
2.	Prytaneion	13.	Hestia stoa	24.	Pheidias' workshop and paleochristian basilica
3.	Philippeion	14.	Hellenistic building	25.	Baths of Kladeos
4.	Temple of Hera	15.	Temple of Zeus	26.	Greek baths
5.	Pelopion	16.	Altar of Zeus	27.	Hostels
6.	Nymphaeum of Herodes Atticus	17.	Ex-voto of Achaeans	28.	Hostels
7.	Metroon	18.	Ex-voto of Mikythos	29.	Leonidaion
8.	Treasuries	19.	Nike of Paeonius	30.	South baths
9.	Crypt (arched way to the stadium)	20.	Gymnasion	31.	Bouleuterion
10.	Stadium	21.	Palaestra	32.	South stoa
11.	Echo Stoa	22.	Theokoleon	33.	Villa of Nero

Treasuries
I.	Sicyon	IV.	Byzantium(?)	VII.	Unidentified	X.	Metapontum
II.	Syracuse	V.	Sybaris(?)	VIII.	Altar(?)	XI.	Megara
III.	Epidamnus(?)	VI.	Cyrene(?)	IX.	Selinunte	XII.	Gela

=== The Altis ===
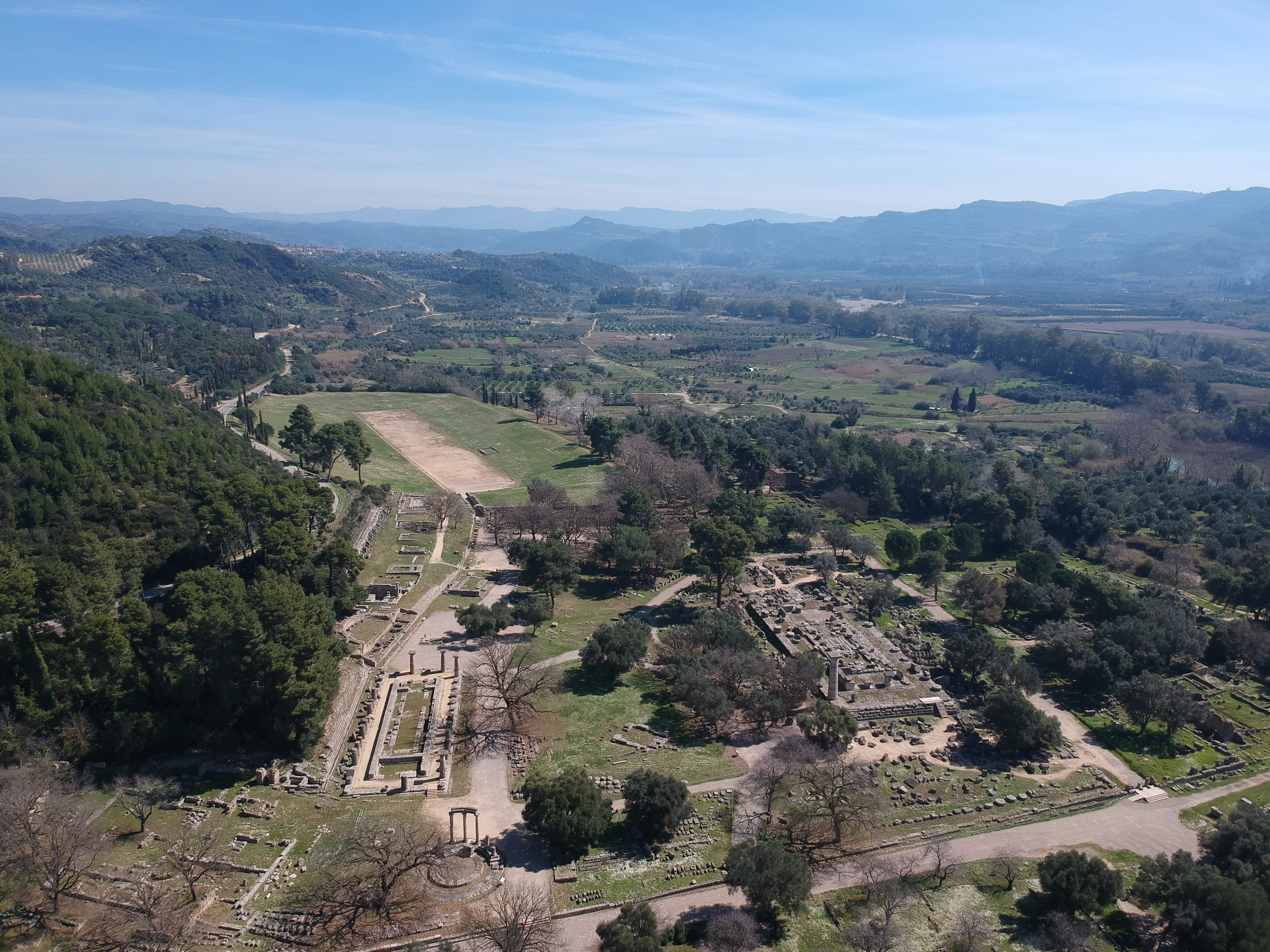
The archaeological site showing the stadium, the temple of Hera, the temple of Zeus. The line of trees, upper right, border a road to the north of the Alfeios. Geologically the site is terraced into the gentle north slope of the Alfeios valley visible in the background.

The Altis was an irregular quadrangular area more than 183 m (200 yd) on each side and walled except to the North where it was bounded by the Kronion (Mount Kronos). It consisted of an arrangement of buildings, the most important of which are the Temple of Hera (or Heraion/Heraeum), the Temple of Zeus, the Pelopion, and open sites used for traditional activities, such as the area of the great altar of Zeus, where the largest sacrifices were made. (Note: The final configuration of the Altis is depicted in "Introduction to tour of Olympia". Tour with pictures. Perseus Digital Library. Archived from the original on 11 February 2021.)

==== The Herakleian sanctuary ====
Pindar, the 5th-century-BC Theban poet, says that Heracles founded the "sacred precinct" (zatheon alsos) next to the tomb of Pelops in honor of Zeus, his own father, referring to the precinct founded as the Altis, and made the "encircling area a resting-place for feasting," honoring the river Alfeios and the 12 Olympian gods. He assigned the name "Hill of Cronus" to the previously unnamed hill, and then instituted the Olympic games. Pindar creates in a single, compact sentence, what has been called "Olympic space". (Note: The sentence is (lines 44-48 of the poem) ... Διὸς ἄλκιμος υἱὸς σταθμᾶτο ζάθεον ἄλσος πατρὶ μεγίστῳ: περὶ δὲ πάξαις Ἄλτιν μὲν ὅγ᾽ ἐν καθαρῷ διέκρινε, τὸ δὲ κύκλῳ πέδον ἔθηκε δόρπου λύσιν ..., which may be translated literally as "the stalwart son of Zeus measured out the sacred grove to his greatest father: having fixed the Altis on the one hand he distinguished it in a clear space and fashioned a plain in the surrounding circle as a relaxing place for festivals." The English does not capture the Greek exactly; the Greek words require some exegesis.) The space is a work of man created by a sequence of operations: first, Herakles lays out (stathmato) the sacred grove (alsos) with a surveying instrument called a stathme. Second, he "fixes" the border of the Altis (paxais Altin), and third clears the space around it (en katharo diekrine). Fourth, he "made" (etheke) ground (pedon) as an entertainment space (lusin) for festivals (dorpou). Then he goes on to "honor" the ford of the Alfeios (necessarily to the south), the twelve gods, and to name the unnamed hill for Kronos. He then can hold the first games.

Today trees have been allowed to grow over the site quasi-grove. These are primarily Cercis siliquastrum, colloquially "Judas-tree" (nothing to do with Judas), a pink-flowering low tree. If they are natural to the site now, they probably were in antiquity. Olea europaea, olive, is of course ubiquitous in the region, usually growing in planted groves, but sometimes wild. Platanus orientalis, the plane tree, is common in the area, and Pinus halepensis. Aleppo pine, also covered Kronion until the fires of 2007–2009.

There is not much indication of what structures were in the Altis, except the games must have been part of the "feasting" and therefore were held in the "resting-place". The size of the precinct must have varied as the site developed, as the original stadium is known to have extended well within the later east wall. That the temple of Zeus was built within the precinct is a reasonable assumption. As there is no trace of a succession of walls, the wall might reasonably be presumed to have been a late feature, but no later than Pindar. (Note: An alternative view is that the stadium began inside the Altis but was moved outside: "The Stadium and the Events". A Tour of Ancient Olympia. Perseus Digital Library. Archived from the original on 14 July 2021.. During its inside phase the spectators must have sat on the hill. In addition to disrespecting Pindar, this view requires a distance of about 100 m (330 ft) between the spectators and the events, a disadvantage easily seen from the current road on the hill, the steep cliff of the hill also being a disadvantage.)

==== The Pelopian sanctuary ====
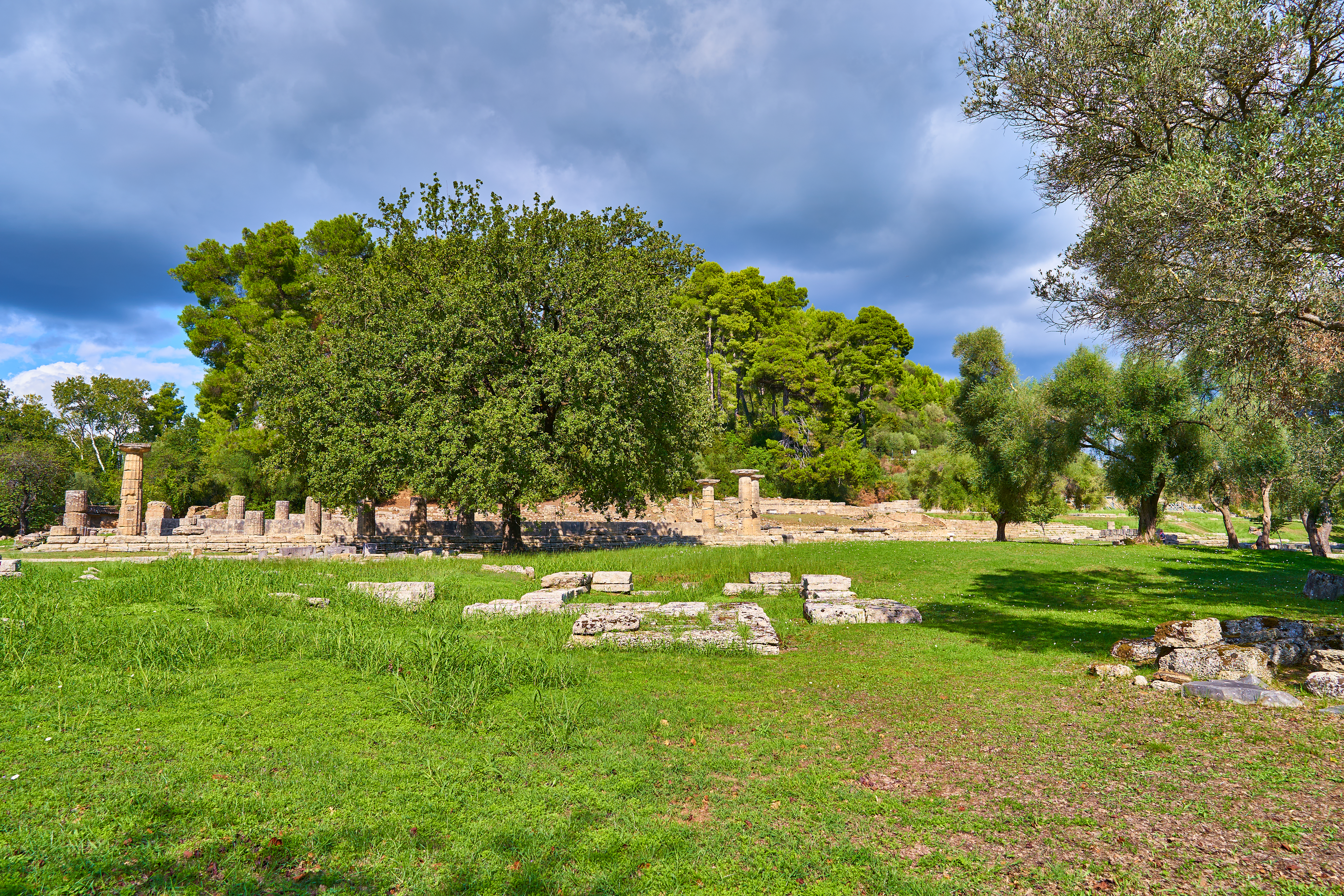
Peribolos wall remains seen in the foreground from the south against the backdrop of the Temple of Hera

The classical Pelopion was a separate sanctuary defined by a peribolos wall dating to the 6th century BC, long after the conventional start of the Olympic games, 776 BC. This was certainly a remodeling of a previously existing sanctuary of Pelops. A 1987-plus excavation of the Pelopion established "a continuous ceramic sequence for the 11th century onward" including submycenaean (1100–1000 BC) and protogeometric (1000–900 BC). There was a good sprinkling of "cultic" material (votive figurines and vases).

==== Etymologies ====
The name Altis was derived from a corruption of the Elean word also meaning "the grove" because the area was wooded, olive and plane trees in particular.

== History ==
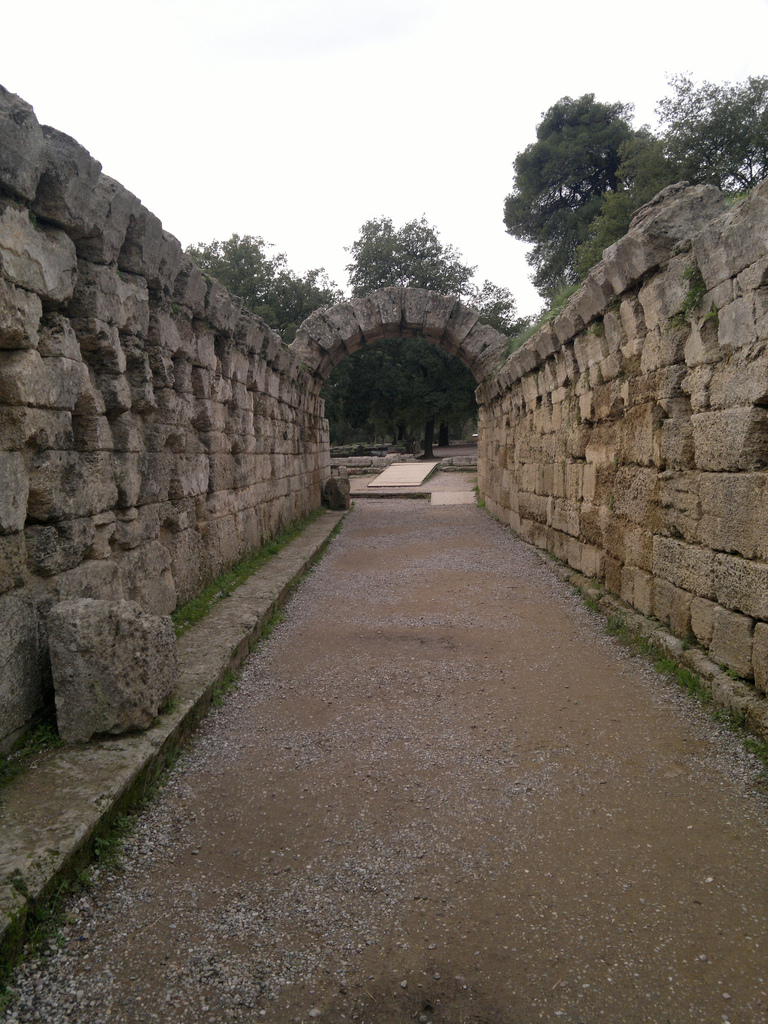
Crypt (arched way to the stadium)

=== Prehistory ===
It used to be thought that the site had been occupied since about 1500 BC, with a religious cult of Zeus developing around 1000 BC. It may be that instead there was only a sanctuary from the 9th or 8th centuries, though the question remains in debate. Others believe that remains of food and burnt offerings dating back to the 10th century BC give evidence of a long history of religious activity at the site. No buildings have survived from this earliest period of use.

=== Geometric and Archaic periods ===
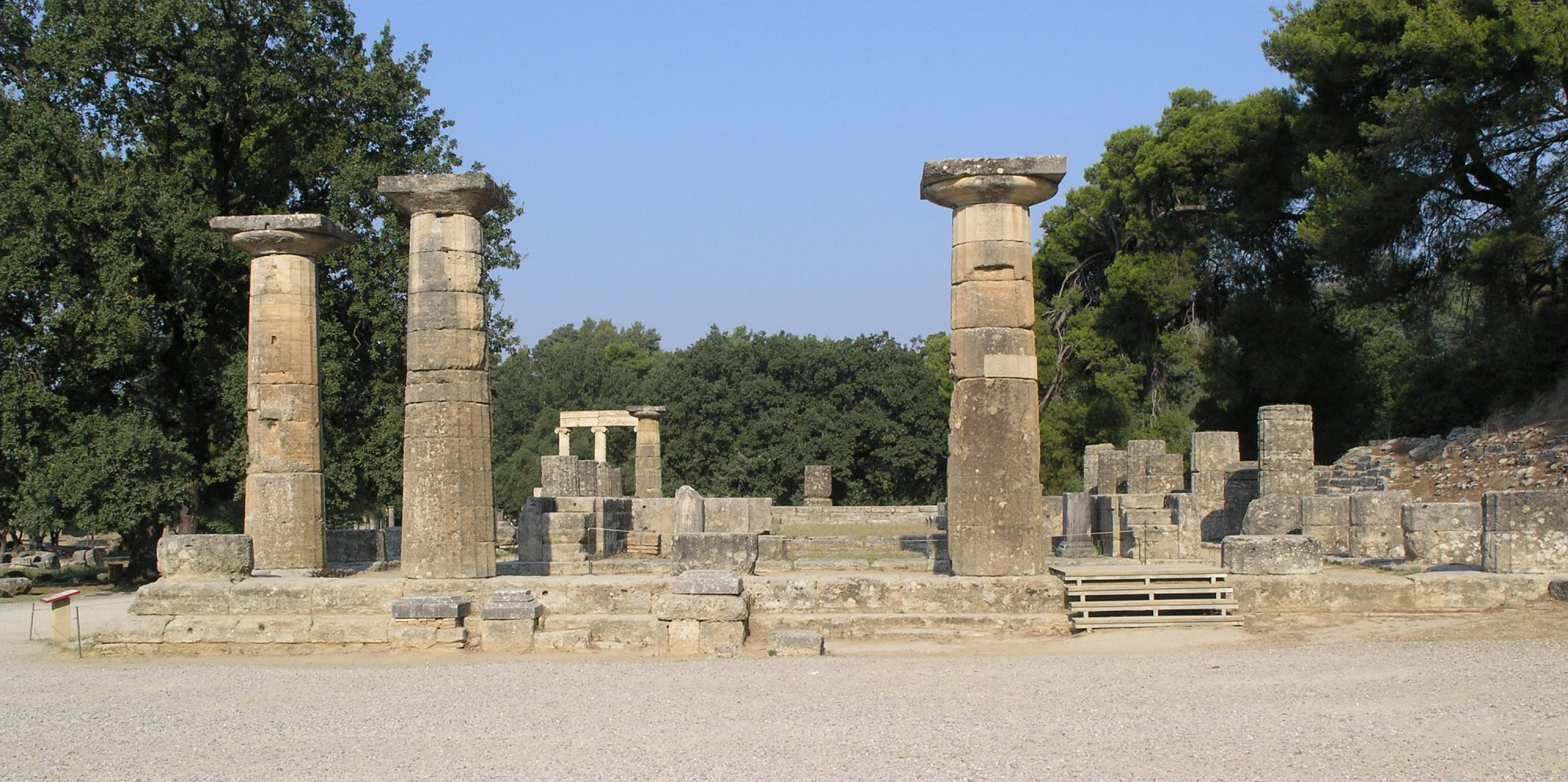
Ruins of the Temple of Hera

The first Olympic festival was organized on the site by the authorities of Elis in the 8th century BC – with tradition dating the first games at 776 BC. Major changes were made to the site around 700 BC, including levelling land and digging new wells. Elis' power diminished and the sanctuary fell into the hands of the Pisatans in 676 BC. The Pisatans organized the games until the late 7th century BC.

The earliest evidence of building activity on the site dates from around 600 BC. At this time, the Skiloudians, allies of the Pisatans, built the Temple of Hera. The Treasuries and the Pelopion were built during the course of the 6th century BC. The secular structures and athletic arenas were also under construction during this period, including the Bouleuterion. The first stadium was constructed around 560 BC and it consisted of just a simple track. The stadium was remodelled around 500 BC with sloping sides for spectators and shifted slightly eastward. Over the course of the 6th century BC a range of sports were added to the Olympic festival. In 580 BC, Elis, in alliance with Sparta, occupied Pisa and regained the control over the sanctuary.

=== Classical period ===
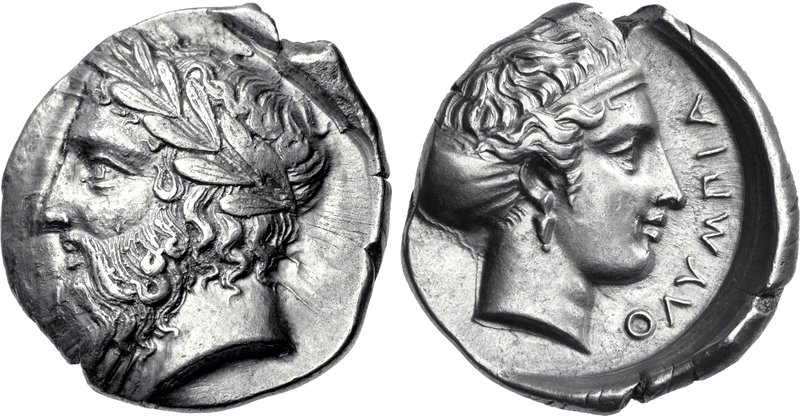
Silver Tetradrachm from Olympia, 360 BC. Obverse: Head of Zeus wearing laurel wreath. Reverse: Head of the nymph Olympia wearing sphendone. ΟΛΥΜΠΙΑ to right.

The classical period, between the 5th and 4th centuries BC, was the golden age of the site at Olympia. A wide range of new religious and secular buildings as well as structures were made.

The Temple of Zeus was built mid 5th century BC. Its size, scale and ornaments were beyond anything previously constructed on the site. The Greek Baths and further sporting facilities, including the final iteration of the stadium, and the hippodrome (for chariot-racing) were constructed. The Prytaneion was built at the northwest side of the site in 470 BC.

In the late classical period, further structures were added to the site. The Metroon was constructed near the Treasuries around 400 BC. The erection of the Echo Stoa, around 350 BC, separated the sanctuary from the area of the games and stadium. The South Stoa was built at the southern edge of the sanctuary at approximately the same time.

=== Hellenistic period ===
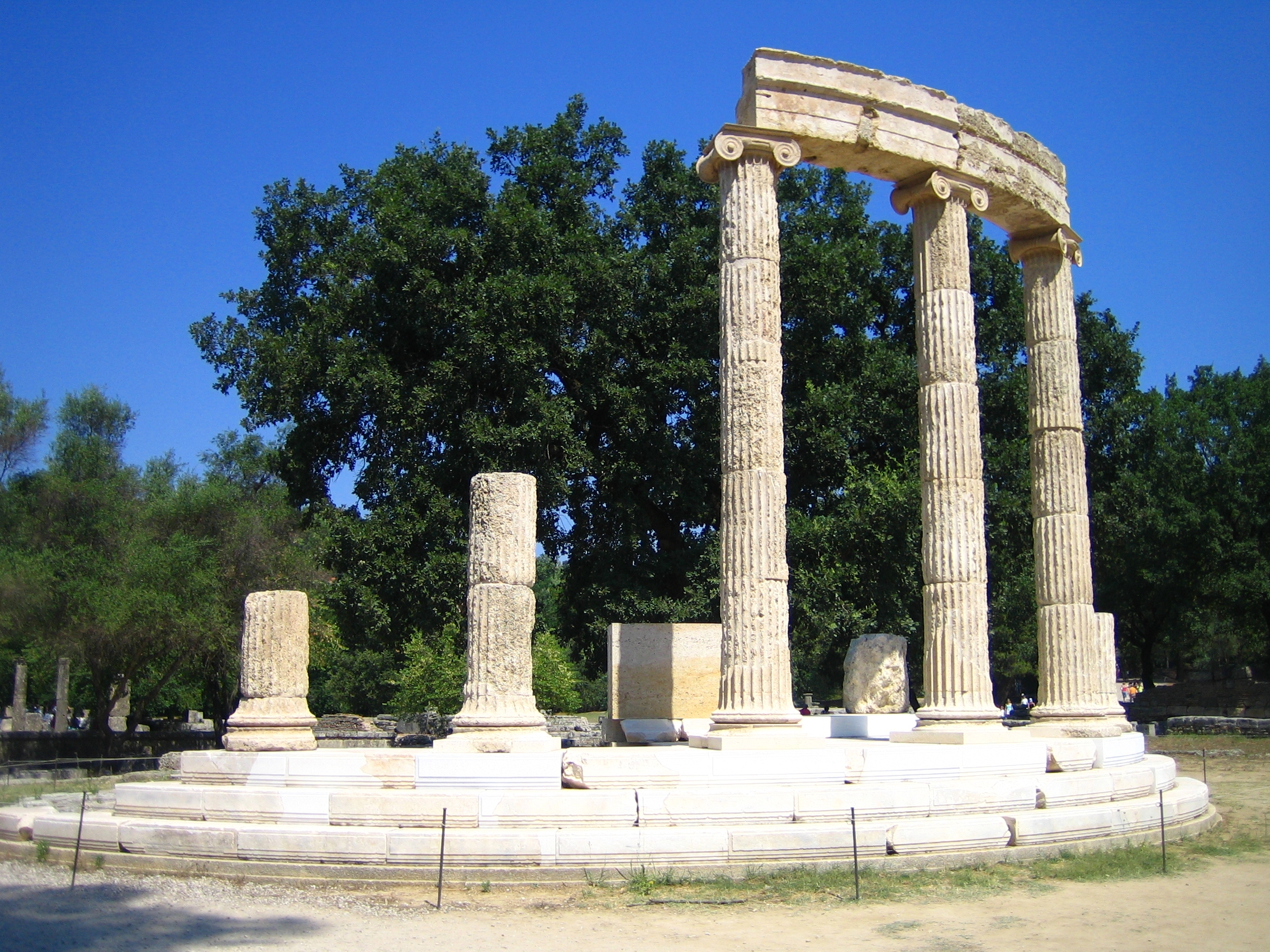
Ruins of the Philippeion

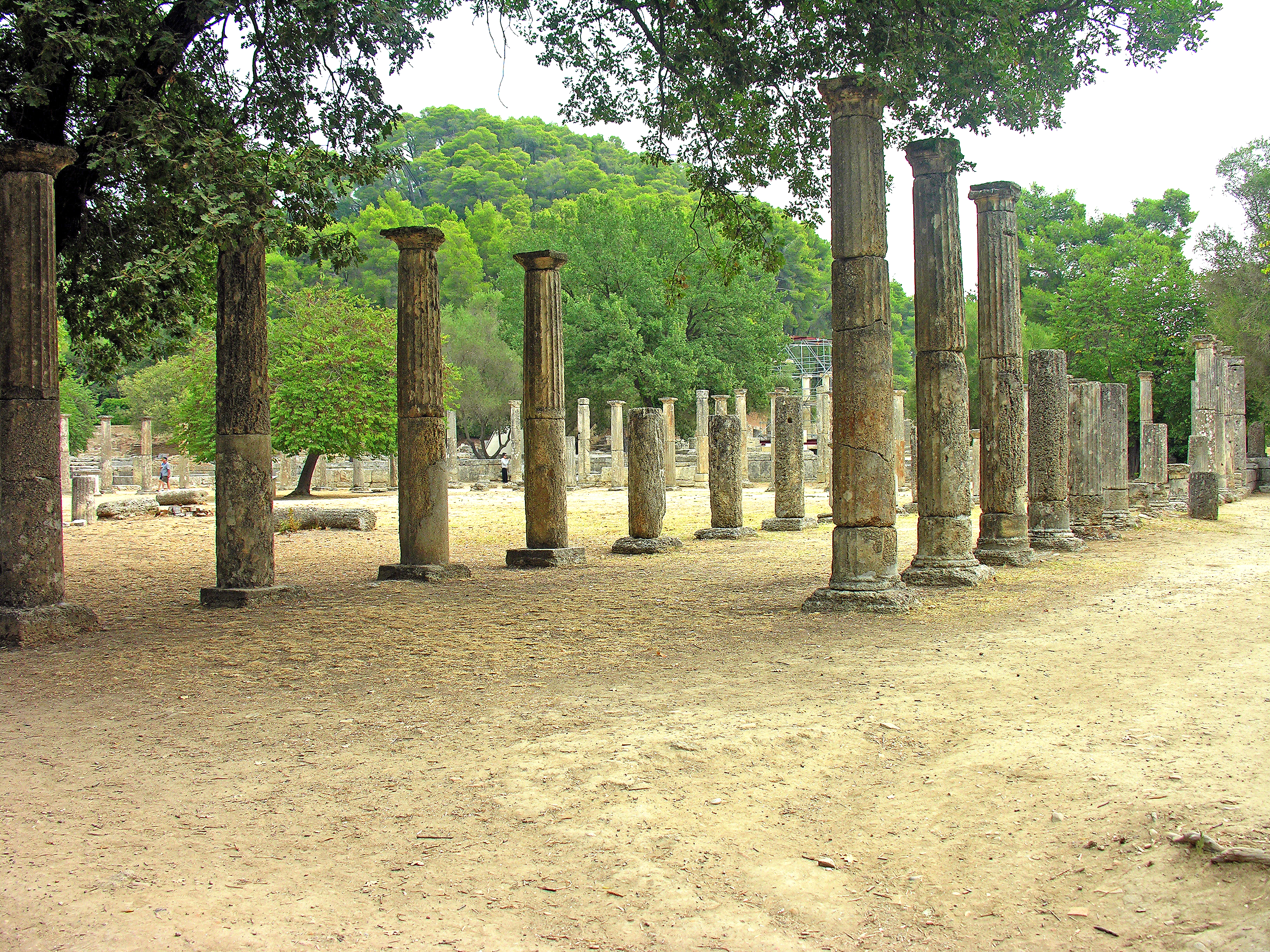
Palaestra at Olympia

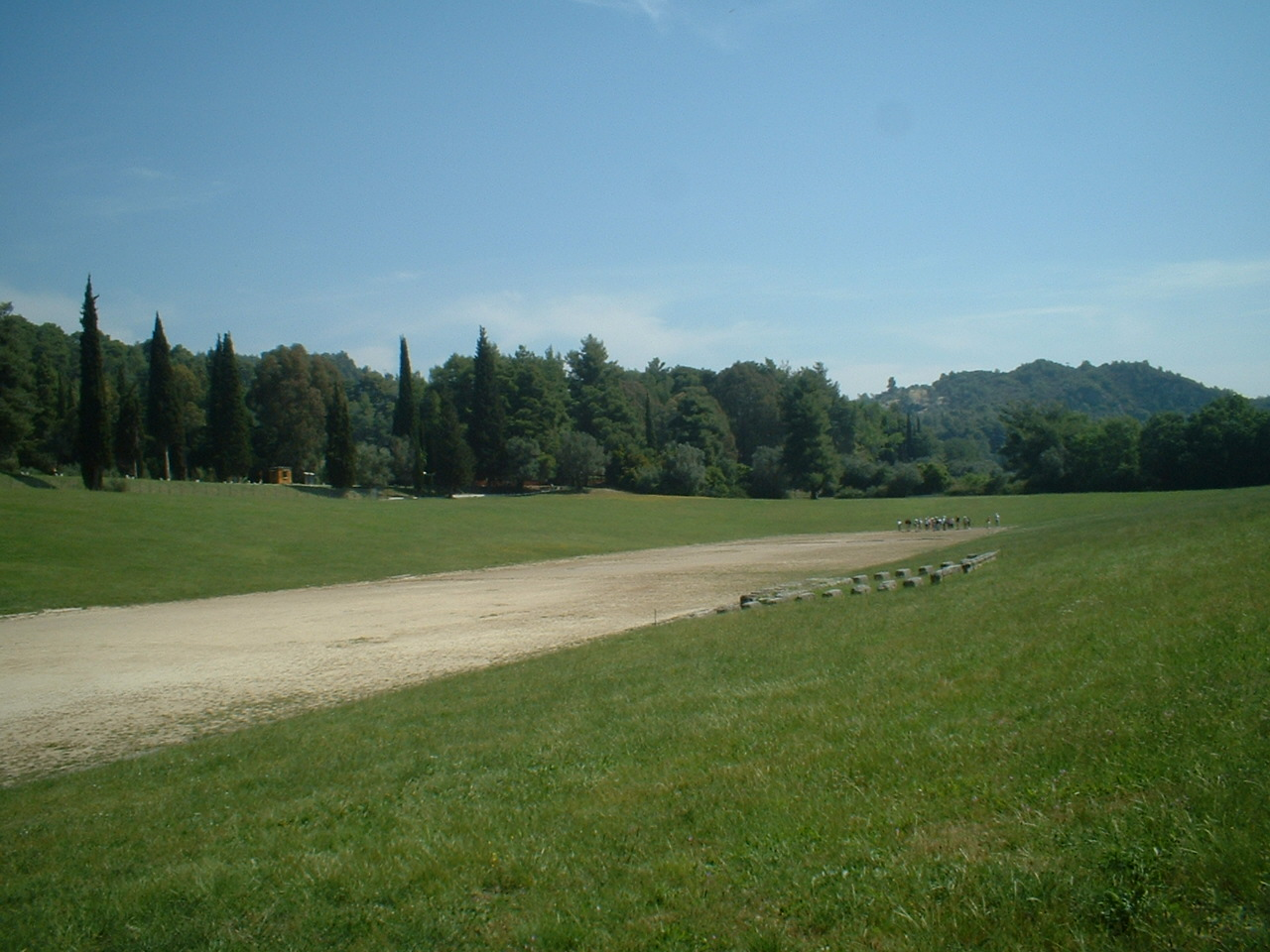
The Olympia stadium

The late 4th century BC saw the erection of the Philippeion. Around 300 BC the largest building on the site, the Leonidaion, was constructed to house important visitors. Due to the increasing significance of the games, further athletic buildings were constructed including the Palaestra (3rd century BC), Gymnasion (2nd century BC) and bath houses (c.300 BC). Finally, in 200 BC, a vaulted archway was erected linking the entrance of the stadium to the sanctuary.

=== Roman period ===
During the Roman period, the games were opened up to all citizens of the Roman Empire. A programme of new buildings and extensive repairs, including to the Temple of Zeus, took place. In 150 AD, the Nympheum (or Exedra) was built. New baths replaced the older Greek examples in 100 AD and an aqueduct was constructed in 160 AD.

The 3rd century saw the site suffer heavy damage from a series of earthquakes. Invading tribes in 267 AD led to the centre of the site being fortified with material robbed from its monuments. Despite the destruction, the Olympic festival continued to be held at the site until the last Olympiad in 393 AD, after which the Christian emperor Theodosius I implemented a ban. The Temple of Zeus was apparently destroyed around 426 AD, during the persecution of pagans in the late Roman Empire, following an edict by Theodosius II enforcing the ban on pagan festivals. The workshop of Pheidias was turned into a Basilica and the site was inhabited by a Christian community. Archaeological evidence suggests that small scale Olympic events (perhaps in Christian guise) were still being held secretly until Justinian's plague and two earthquakes devastated the place mid 6th century. Repeated floods ensured that the settlement was finally abandoned altogether in the early 7th Century.

== Archaeology ==
=== Discovery and early excavations ===
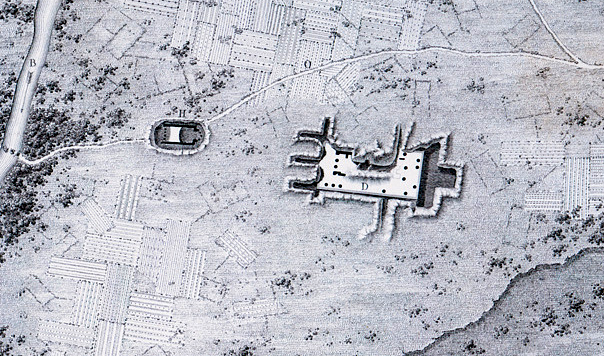
Map of the first archaeological excavations in Olympia and of the temple of Olympian Zeus discovered by the expedition of Morea in May 1829 (by Abel Blouet and Pierre Achille Poirot)

Over time the site was buried under alluvial deposits, up to 8 metres deep, long thought to be the result of river flooding. Modern research hypothesizes instead—based on the presence of mollusc and gastropod shells and foraminifera— that the site was buried by sea waters resulting from repeated tsunamis. (Note: "Both the composition and thickness of the sediments we find in Olympia do not go with the hydraulic potential of the Kladeos River and the geomorphological inventory of the valley." Dr. Vött.) The exact site was re-discovered in 1766 by the English antiquarian Richard Chandler. Since then, the site had been visited by several other antiquarian-travellers such as Louis-François-Sébastien Fauvel, François Pouqueville, William Gell, Charles Robert Cockerell and William Martin Leake.

The first excavation was not carried out until 1829, when the French archaeologists of the "Expedition Scientifique de Morée" arrived on the site of the sanctuary at Olympia on 10 May 1829. As most of the buildings were invisible, the general identification was made possible thanks to the more precise descriptions of Edward Dodwell and John Spencer Stanhope. The French archaeologists spent six weeks on the site. Léon-Jean-Joseph Dubois (director of the section of Archaeology) and Abel Blouet (director of the section of Architecture and Sculpture) undertook the first excavations, accompanied by the painters Pierre Achille Poirot, Pierre Félix Trézel and Amaury-Duval. The site was divided topographically into squares, trenches were dug, excavations were undertaken in straight lines, and models for restoration were proposed: archaeology was becoming rationalized, and it was in this way that the location and identity of the Temple of Zeus were determined for the first time.

=== 1875–1881 ===
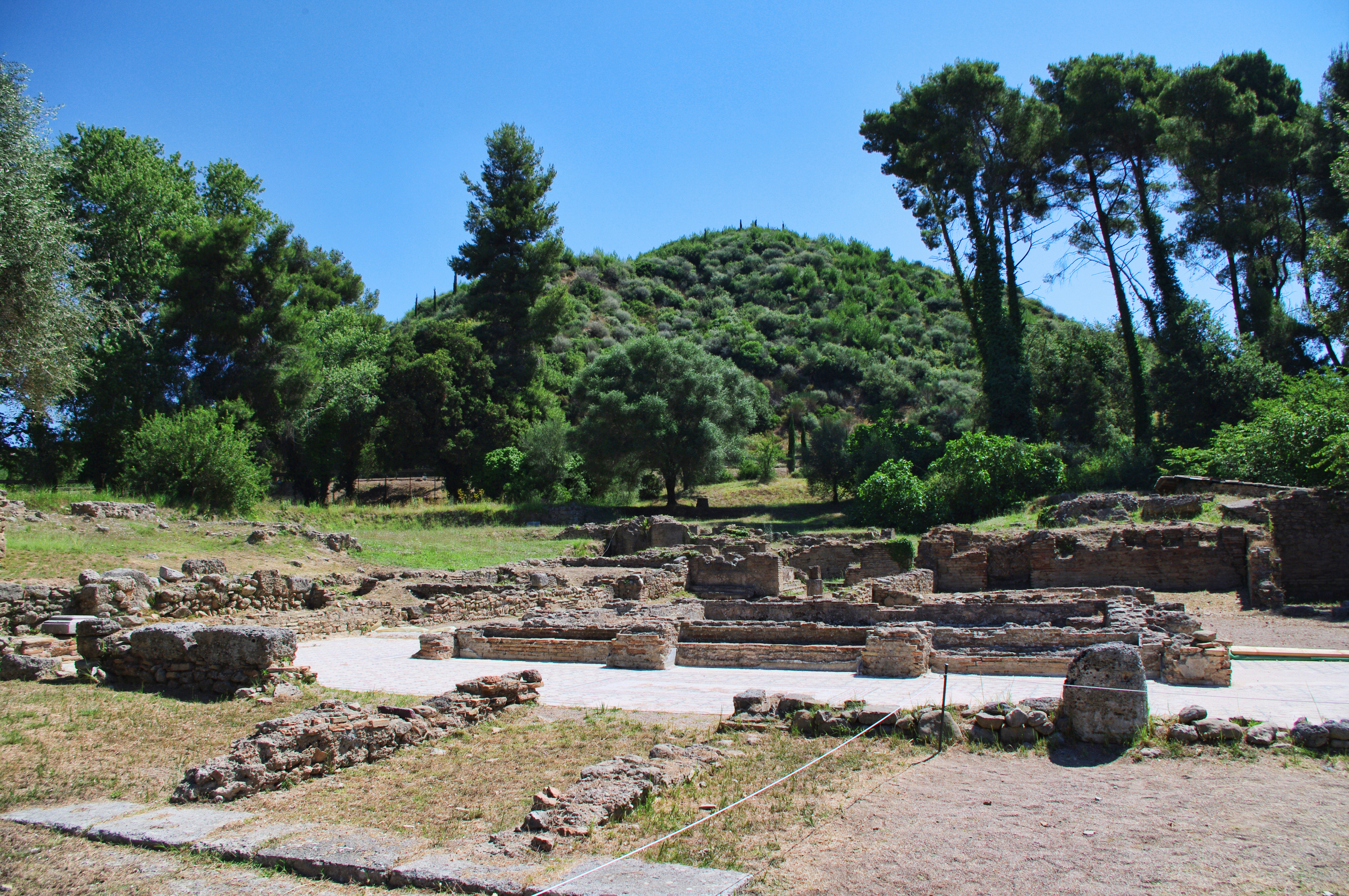
Kronios baths or north baths

Since the 1870s, the excavation and preservation of Ancient Olympia has been the responsibility of the German Archaeological Institute at Athens. The first major excavation of Olympia began in 1875, funded by the German government after negotiation of exclusive access by Ernst Curtius. Other archaeologists responsible for the dig were Gustav Hirschfeld, George Treu, Adolf Furtwängler (who worked alongside architects), A. Boetticher, Wilhelm Dörpfeld, and Richard Borrmann. They excavated the central part of the sanctuary including the Temple of Zeus, Temple of Hera, Metroon, Bouleuterion, Philipeion, Echo Stoa, Treasuries and Palaestra. Important finds included sculptures from the Temple of Zeus, the Nike of Paeonius, the Hermes of Praxiteles and many bronzes. In total 14,000 objects were recorded. The finds were displayed in a museum on the site.

=== 1900–1950 ===
Excavation continued in a more limited way by Dörpfeld between 1908 and 1929 but a new systematic excavation began in 1936 on the occasion of the 1936 Summer Olympics in Berlin under Emil Kunze and Hans Schleif. Their excavation focus was on the area to the south of the stadium, the South Stoa, bath complex and gymnasion.

=== 1950 to present ===
Between 1952 and 1966, Kunze continued the excavation joined by architect Alfred Mallwitz. They excavated Pheidias' workshop, the Leonidaion and the north wall of the stadium. They also excavated the southeast section of the sanctuary and out of approximately 140 debris pits found many bronze and ceramic objects along with terracotta roof tiles.

Mallwitz took charge of the excavations between 1972 and 1984 revealing important dating evidence for the stadium, graves, and the location of the Prytaneion. From 1984 to 1996, Helmut Kyrieleis took over the site and the focus shifted to the earlier history of the sanctuary with excavation of the Prytaneion and Pelopion.

In March 2021, archaeologists announced the discovery of a 2,500-year-old bronze bull figurine near the temple of Zeus. According to archaeologist Zaharaoula Leventouri, one of the figurine's horns was noticed sticking out of the ground after a heavy rainfall. Researchers also found fine pottery remains from the Geometric art period.

== Modern Olympia ==
=== The municipality ===
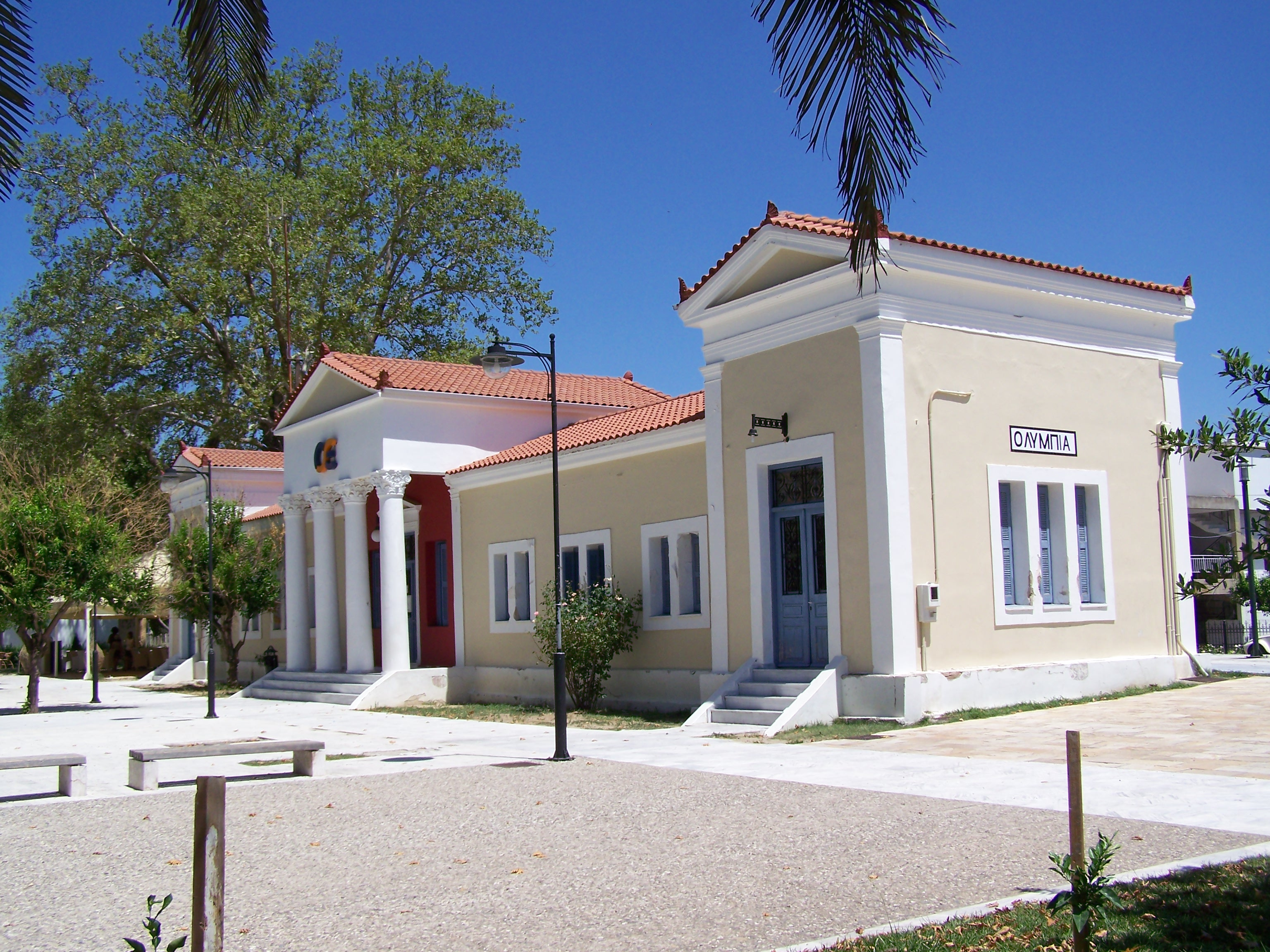
Olympia's railway station

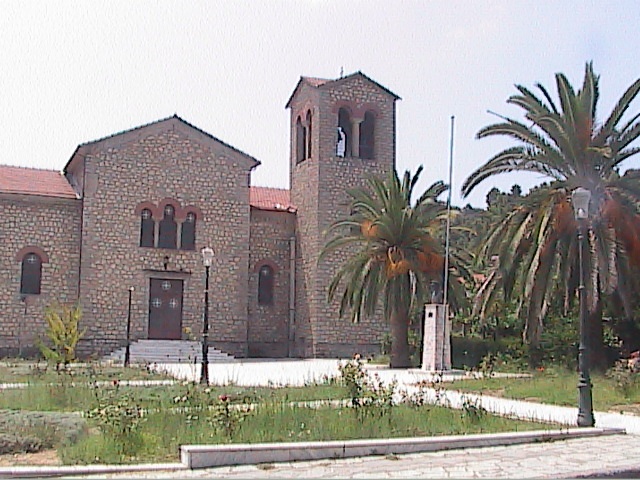
Modern Olympia square with church

The ancient site of the games had been included during all the intervening centuries within a community yet called Olympia. In modern terms it became Archaia Olympia, "Ancient Olympia," and was a deme, or municipality, of its own. In 2011 it was combined for reasons of economy of government with three other former demes within which union the four became municipal units. The terminology can be confusing, as "ancient Olympia" can be either the modern municipal unit, or only the site of the ruins. (Note: The Greeks have a unique municipal system due partly to the terrain and partly as a legacy. The basic residential unit is the deme, translated to "municipality." Demes can be any size but historically they have been mountain villages. They were independent, but independence requires the duplication of municipal government for each village. If instead the demes were several villages, they could pool services. In that case one village is a "municipal unit." These were set by government in the Kallikrates Law of 2011.)

The town has a railway station and is the easternmost terminus of the line of Olympia-Pyrgos (Ilia). The train station with the freight yard to its west is located about 300 m east of the town centre. It is linked by the EO74 road, and the new road was opened in the 1980s. The next stretch N and NE of Olympia opened in 2005. The distance from Pyrgos is 20 km (12 mi), about 50 km (31 mi) SW of Lampeia, W of Tripoli and Arcadia and 4 km (2 mi) north of Krestena and N of Kyparissia and Messenia. The highway passes north of the ancient ruins. A reservoir is located a few kilometres to the west, impounding the Alfeios River for hydroelectric purposes. The catchment up to Olympia is flat or rolling and is agricultural; upstream from Olympia the river drains the foothills of the mountains. Much of the land around the archaeological site is given to dendriculture; that is, symmetric rows of olive trees.

The site and town of Olympia were threatened by the 2007 forest fires, but no damage was reported.

=== Municipal units ===
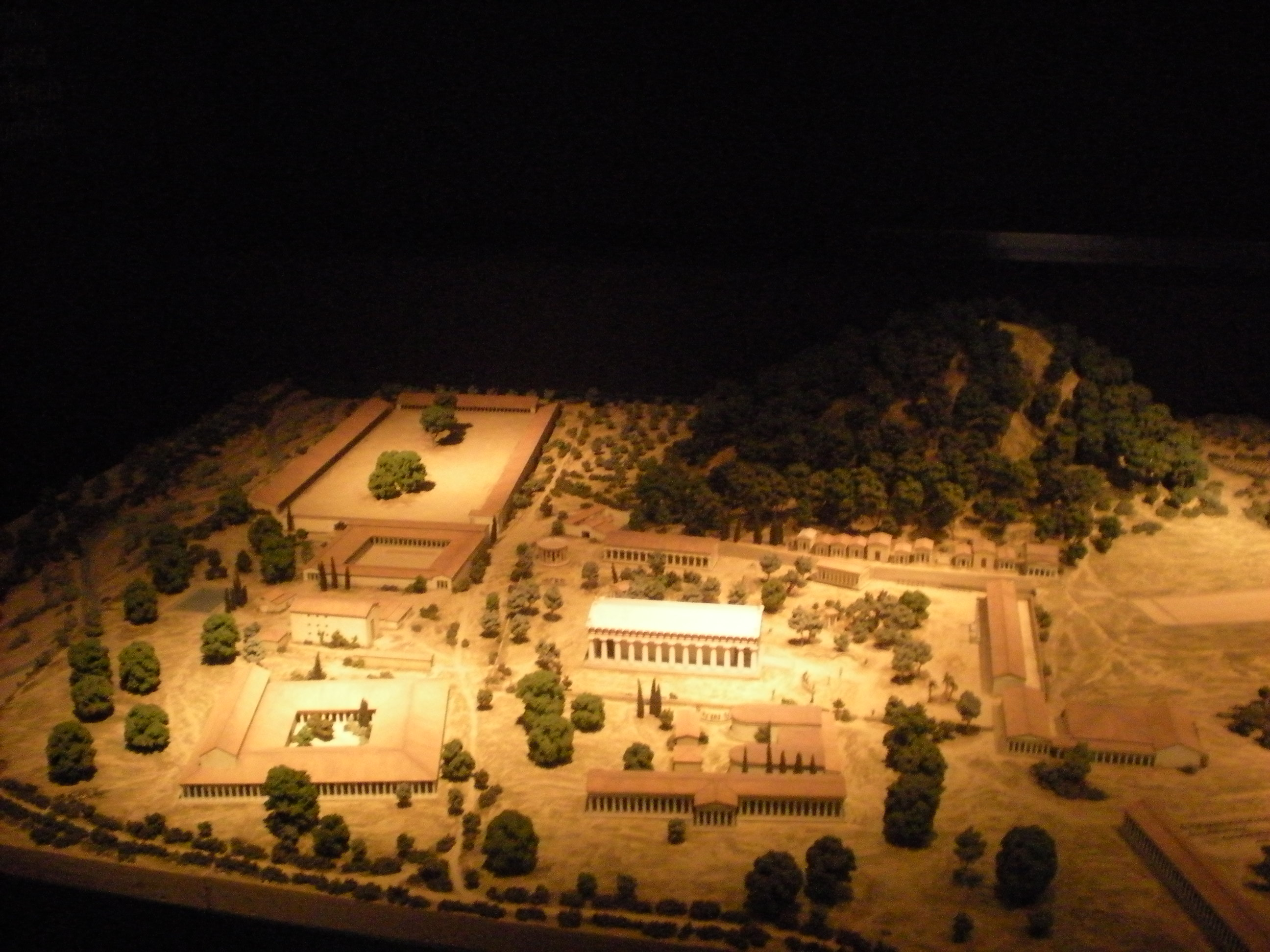
Architectural model of the enclosure of the sanctuary of Olympia, Greece.

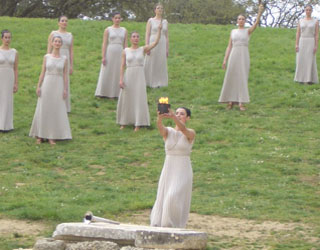
Olympian flame lighting ceremony

The name of Archaia Olympia ("Ancient Olympia") was extended to the new municipality of 2011. Four former municipalities became municipal units:

- Archaia Olympia
- Foloi
- Lampeia
- Lasiona

Archaia Olympia now applied to both a municipality and a unit. The municipality has an area of 545.121 km^{2}, the municipal unit 178.944 km^{2}.

For the subdivisions of the municipal units of Foloi, Lampeia, and Lasiona, see under those topics. The municipal unit of Archaia Olympia is divided into the following communities (villages within the communities given in brackets):

- Archaia Olympia (Archaia Olympia, Drouva)
- Archaia Pisa (Archaia Pisa, International Olympic Academy)
- Aspra Spitia
- Chelidoni
- Flokas
- Irakleia
- Kafkonia
- Kamena (Kamena, Nea Kamena)
- Kladeos
- Koskinas (Koskinas, Fanaras)
- Kryoneri
- Linaria
- Louvro (Louvro, Gyros)
- Mageiras
- Mouria
- Pefkes
- Pelopio
- Platanos (Platanos, Agios Georgios)
- Pournari
- Smila (Smila, Karoutes)
- Strefi (Strefi, Kato Strefi)
- Vasilaki (Vasilaki, Ypsilo)
- Xirokampos (Xirokampos, Ampari)

=== Historical population ===
Year	Community	Municipal unit	Municipality
1981	1,129	–	–
1991	1,742	11,229	–
2001	936	9,689	-
2011	972	8,128	13,409
2021	882	6,859	11,153

== Notable people ==
- Vyronas Davos, historian and poet
- Panagiotis Kondylis, one of the most prominent modern Greek thinkers and philosophers
- Nikos Konstantopoulos, politician

When Pierre de Coubertin, the founder of the International Olympic Committee, died in 1937, a monument to him was erected at ancient Olympia and, emulating Evangelis Zappas, whose head is buried under a statue in front of the Zappeion, his heart was buried at the monument.

== Reinstitution of the games ==
After suppression of the ancient Olympic Games in 394 AD by Theodosius I, the spirit of the games, international peaceful competition by individuals for excellence, continued. The games were resurrected in 1894 based on the ancient model, but more international than ever. The ideology of the new games turned to the site of ancient Olympia for its inspiration, where even the ruins assumed a symbolic significance. The Olympic flame of the modern-day Olympic Games is lit by reflection of sunlight in a parabolic mirror in front of the Temple of Hera and then transported by a torch to the place where the Games are held. When the 2004 Summer Olympics was hosted by Athens, the men's and women's shot put competitions were held at the Olympia stadium. Although the shot put is not among the modern athletics events with a lineage dating back to the ancient Olympics, it was chosen as requiring least disruption at a sensitive archeological site.

Buildings and monuments in Olympia have been selected numerous times as main motif of collectors' coins. One of the recent samples is the €100 Greek Crypt of Olympia commemorative coin, minted in 2003 to commemorate the 2004 Olympics. In the obverse of the coin, the Crypt of Olympia is depicted. The crypt is a long and narrow vaulted passage through which the athletes and judges entered the Stadium, signifying the opening of the games.

== See also ==
- List of settlements in Elis
- Archaeological Museum of Olympia
- German Archaeological Institute at Athens
- Museum of Ancient Greek Technology in Katakolo

== Bibliography ==
- Averett, Erin Walcek (2007). Dedications in Clay: Terracotta Figurines in Early Iron Age Greece (c. 1100–700 BCE) (PDF) (PhD). University of Missouri-Columbia.
- Bickerman, E.J. (1982). Chronology of the ancient world (2nd ed.). Ithaca, N.Y.: Cornell Univ. Press. ISBN 080141282X.
- Blouet, A., Ravoisié, A., Poirot, A., Trézel, F., and de Gournay, F. (1831, 1833, 1838). Expedition scientifique de Morée ordonnée par le Gouvernement Français; Architecture, Sculptures, Inscriptions et Vues du Péloponèse, des Cyclades et de l'Attique, 3 Volumes, Firmin Didot, Paris.
- Eckerman, Christopher (2013). "The Landscape and Heritage of Pindar's Olympia". The Classical World. 107 (1): 3–33. doi:10.1353/clw.2013.0102. JSTOR 24699861.
- Gates, C. (2003). Ancient cities: the archaeology of urban life in the Ancient Near East and Egypt, Greece and Rome. Psychology Press, 2003. p. 234
- Saïtas, I. et al. (2011, 2017). The work of the Morea scientific expedition 1829–1838, 2 Parts, edited by Yiannis Saïtas, editions Melissa, Athens.
- Wilson, N. (2013). Encyclopedia of Ancient Greece. Routledge, 2013. p. 513, ISBN 9781136788000
- Young, D. C. (1996). The Modern Olympics – A Struggle for Revival. The Johns Hopkins University Press, 1996. ISBN 0801853745
