= Vounargo =

Vounargo Βούναργο
- Community
- Location within Greece
- Coordinates: 37°44′N 21°25′E
- Country: Greece
- Administrative region: West Greece
- Regional unit: Elis
- Municipality: Pyrgos
- Municipal unit: Iardanos
- Elevation: 90 m (300 ft)

Population (2021)
  - Community: 721
- Time zone: UTC+2 (EET)
  - Summer (DST): UTC+3 (EEST)
- Vehicle registration: ΗΑ

Vounargo (Greek: Βούναργο) is a village in the municipal unit of Iardanos, Elis, Greece. Since the 2011 local government reform it is part of the municipality Pyrgos. Vounargo was the seat of the former municipality Iardanos. It is situated at the foot of low hills to the north. It is 8 km northwest of Pyrgos, 9 km southeast of Amaliada and 11 km west of Karatoula.

== Population ==
Year	Population
1981	922
1991	847
2001	750
2011	778
2021	721
