= Krestena =

Krestena Κρέστενα
- Community
- Location within Greece
- Coordinates: 37°35.5′N 21°37.2′E
- Country: Greece
- Administrative region: West Greece
- Regional unit: Elis
- Municipality: Andritsaina-Krestena
- Municipal unit: Skillounta

Population (2021)
  - Community: 1,911
- Time zone: UTC+2 (EET)
  - Summer (DST): UTC+3 (EEST)
- Vehicle registration: ΗΑ

Krestena (Greek: Κρέστενα) is a town and a community in Elis, West Greece, Greece. Since the 2011 local government reform it is part of the municipality Andritsaina-Krestena, of which it is the seat of administration. Krestena is situated in the low hills between the river Alfeios and the Ionian Sea. It is 2 km southeast of Makrisia, 6 km south of Olympia, 12 km north of Zacharo and 18 km southeast of Pyrgos. The community includes the villages Poros and Moschoula. The town has a kindergarten, schools, a lyceum, a gymnasium, a center of environmental training, two churches, restaurants, banks, a police station, a fire brigade, a medical center and a post office. Greek National Road 76 (Kallikomo - Andritsaina - Megalopoli) passes west of the town. Samiko beach is located approximately 6 kilometers to the southeast and the thermal springs of Kaiafas are 11 kilometers to the south.

== Population ==
Year	Town	Community
1981	3,539	-
1991	-	5,422
2001	4,903	5,783
2011	1,864	2,356
2021	1,642	1,911
