= Andritsaina-Krestena =

Andritsaina-Krestena Ανδρίτσαινα-Κρέστενα
- Municipality
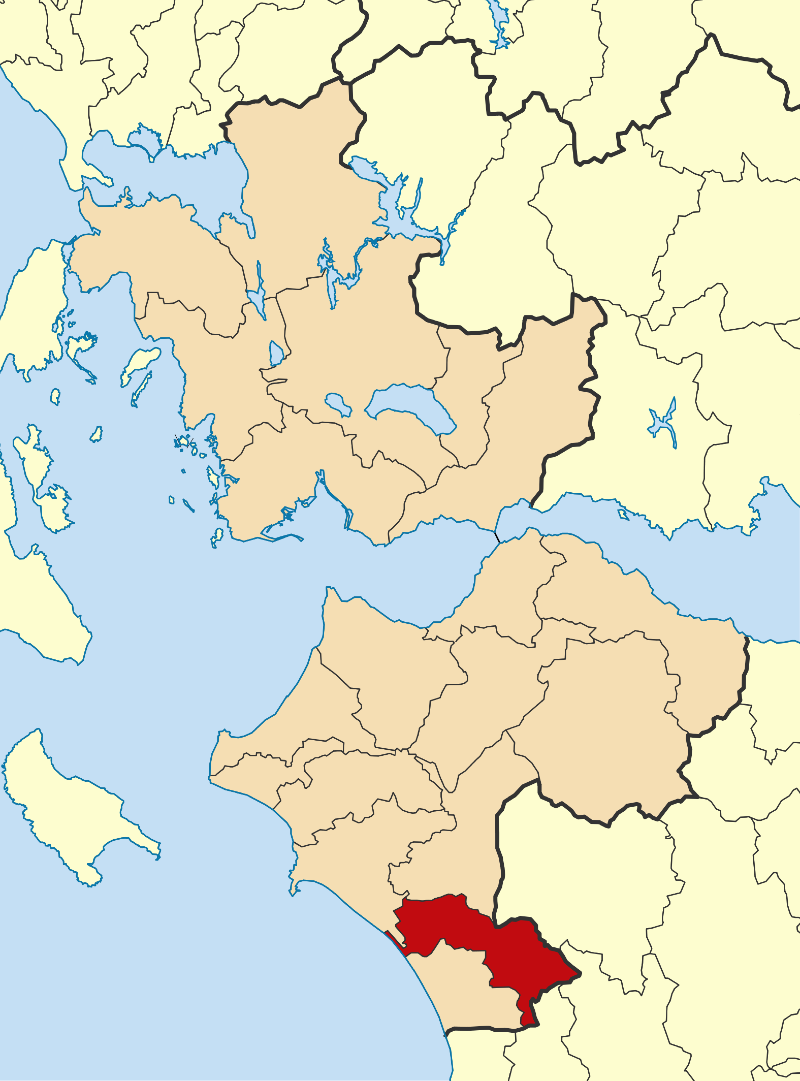

- Location within Greece
- Coordinates: 37°33′N 21°49′E
- Country: Greece
- Administrative region: West Greece
- Regional unit: Elis

Area
  - Municipality: 422.3 km^{2} (163.1 sq mi)

Population (2021)
  - Municipality: 11,200
  - Density: 26.5/km^{2} (68.7/sq mi)
- Time zone: UTC+2 (EET)
  - Summer (DST): UTC+3 (EEST)
- Website: www.andritsainas-krestenon.gov.gr

Andritsaina–Krestena (Greek: Ανδρίτσαινα-Κρέστενα) is a municipality in the Elis regional unit, West Greece region, Greece. The seat of the municipality is the town Krestena. The municipality has an area of 422.334 km^{2}.

== Municipality ==
The municipality Andritsaina–Krestena was formed at the 2011 local government reform by the merger of the following 3 former municipalities, that became municipal units:

- Alifeira
- Andritsaina
- Skillounta
