= Kourtesi =

Kourtesi Κουρτέσι
- Community
- Location within Greece
- Coordinates: 37°58.7′N 21°19.2′E
- Country: Greece
- Administrative region: West Greece
- Regional unit: Elis
- Municipality: Andravida-Kyllini
- Municipal unit: Vouprasia
- Elevation: 5 m (16 ft)

Population (2021)
  - Community: 554
- Time zone: UTC+2 (EET)
  - Summer (DST): UTC+3 (EEST)
- Postal code: 270 00
- Area code: 26230

Kourtesi (Greek: Κουρτέσι) is a village and a community in the southwestern part of the municipal unit of Vouprasia, Elis, Greece. It is in a flat rural area, southeast of the Kotychi lagoon, 7 km southwest of Varda in the northeast, 1 km east of Areti and 7 km northeast of Lechaina. Kourtesi lies on the Greek National Road 9 connecting Patras and Pyrgos, and on the railway from Patras to Pyrgos. The community consists of the villages Kourtesi, Ano Kourtesi and Kotteika. The smaller villages Ano Kourtesi and Kotteika lie to the southeast of Kourtesi.

== Population ==
| Year | Village population | Community population |
|---|---|---|
| 1981 | - | 781 |
| 1991 | 490 | - |
| 2001 | 528 | 838 |
| 2011 | 385 | 657 |
| 2021 | 403 | 554 |

== See also ==
- List of settlements in Elis
