= Areti, Elis =

Areti Αρετή
- Community
- Location within Greece
- Coordinates: 37°58′N 21°18′E
- Country: Greece
- Administrative region: West Greece
- Regional unit: Elis
- Municipality: Andravida-Kyllini
- Municipal unit: Lechaina
- Elevation: 5 m (16 ft)

Population (2021)
  - Community: 202
- Time zone: UTC+2 (EET)
  - Summer (DST): UTC+3 (EEST)

Areti (Greek: Αρετή) is a community in the municipal unit of Lechaina, Elis, Greece. It is situated in a flat, rural area, south of the Kotychi lagoon. It is 1 km west of Kourtesi and 5 km northeast of Lechaina. The Greek National Road 9/E55 (Patras - Pyrgos) and the railway Patras - Pyrgos pass south of the village. The site of ancient Myrsinus (known as Myrtuntium in later times) is located near Areti.

The old name of the village was Retouni (Ρετούνη) and was changed in 1959 to Areti.

== Panagia Retouniotissa ==
Panagia Retouniotissa (Greek: Παναγία Ρετουνιώτισσα) literally Our Lady of Retouni is a name given to an image of the Theotokos, which has developed into a long-lasting tradition and is widely adored in the village of Areti. Its story is connected with a series of events that are credited as divine intervention, which led to the founding of a small Church devoted to the Marian epithet of the Life-giving Spring.

In the late 19th century, near Metochi, a shepherd named Giorgos Alexandropoulos (Γιώργος Αλεξανδρόπουλος) found water in a cave near the Black Mountains (Μαύρα Βουνά), a region close to Areti. As he bend over to drink, he located an icon of Panagia on a flat space on the inside. He had previously seen a dream with a similar divine revelation.

The shepherd transferred the image to the village of Retouni, today Areti, and placed it in the Church of the Zoodochou Pigi. However, after some time had passed, it was decided that the bones of an old ascetic were to be moved from the place of the revelation of the icon. Then, according to tradition, the icon started to "disappear" from the church and would miraculously return to its original place in the mountains, where it had been found originally. The icons' persistence to returning to its original spot was considered as divine revelation. Residents of the village and the priest decided to leave it there, and after a while, during the night, a small chapel was constructed in the location.

Since then, the image of Our Lady of Retouni has been kept there, and residents make a pilgrimage to the image every year on the Sunday after the 15th of August, the celebration of the Dormition of the Mother of God. A special Divine Liturgy has been devoted to the occasion with participation from both believers and pilgrims.

== Population ==
Year	Population
1981	527
1991	447
2001	499
2011	220
2021	202

== See also ==
- Arete
- List of settlements in Elis
