= Nisi, Elis =

Nisi Νησί
- Community
- Location within Greece
- Coordinates: 37°59′N 21°25′E
- Country: Greece
- Administrative region: West Greece
- Regional unit: Elis
- Municipality: Andravida-Kyllini
- Municipal unit: Vouprasia

Population (2021)
  - Community: 308
- Time zone: UTC+2 (EET)
  - Summer (DST): UTC+3 (EEST)

Nisi (Greek: Νησί) is a village and a community in the municipal unit of Vouprasia, Elis, Greece. It is situated in low hills, 4 km south of Neapoli, 8 km northwest of Aetorrachi, 7 km southeast of Varda and 35 km north of Pyrgos. The community includes the small villages Agia Marina, Agios Athanasios, Karavoulaiika and Kremmydi.

== Population ==
Year	Village population	Community population
1981	-	620
1991	378	-
2001	378	661
2011	203	352
2021	180	308

== See also ==
- List of settlements in Elis
