= Kapeleto =

Kapeleto Καπελέτο
- Community
- Location within Greece
- Coordinates: 38°00′N 21°22′E
- Country: Greece
- Administrative region: West Greece
- Regional unit: Elis
- Municipality: Andravida-Kyllini
- Municipal unit: Vouprasia

Population (2021)
  - Community: 476
- Time zone: UTC+2 (EET)
  - Summer (DST): UTC+3 (EEST)

Kapeleto (Greek: Καπελέτο) is a village and a community in the municipal unit Vouprasia, Elis, Greece. It is located in a rural area, 4 km south of the town of Varda, 5 km northeast of Kourtesi and 37 km north of Pyrgos. The community includes the village Thanasoulaiika. Within the community's limits is the traditional site of the ancient city of Myrtuntium.

== Historical population ==
Year	Village population	Community population
1981	-	612
1991	518	-
2001	453	568
2011	362	566
2021	260	476
