= Agioi Theodoroi, Elis =

Agioi Theodoroi Άγιοι Θεόδωροι
- Settlement
- Location within Greece
- Coordinates: 37°57′N 21°20′E
- Country: Greece
- Administrative region: West Greece
- Regional unit: Elis
- Municipality: Andravida-Kyllini
- Municipal unit: Lechaina
- Community: Lechaina
- Elevation: 40 m (130 ft)

Population (2021)
  - Total: 164
- Time zone: UTC+2 (EET)
  - Summer (DST): UTC+3 (EEST)

Agioi Theodoroi (Greek: Άγιοι Θεόδωροι) is a small hamlet in the community and municipal unit of Lechaina, Greece. The village is situated 6 km east of Lechaina proper, on the road to Melissa and Borsi.

== Population ==
Year	Population
1991	192
2001	175
2011	194
2021	164

== See also ==
- List of settlements in Elis
