= Manolada =

Manolada Μανολάδα
- Community
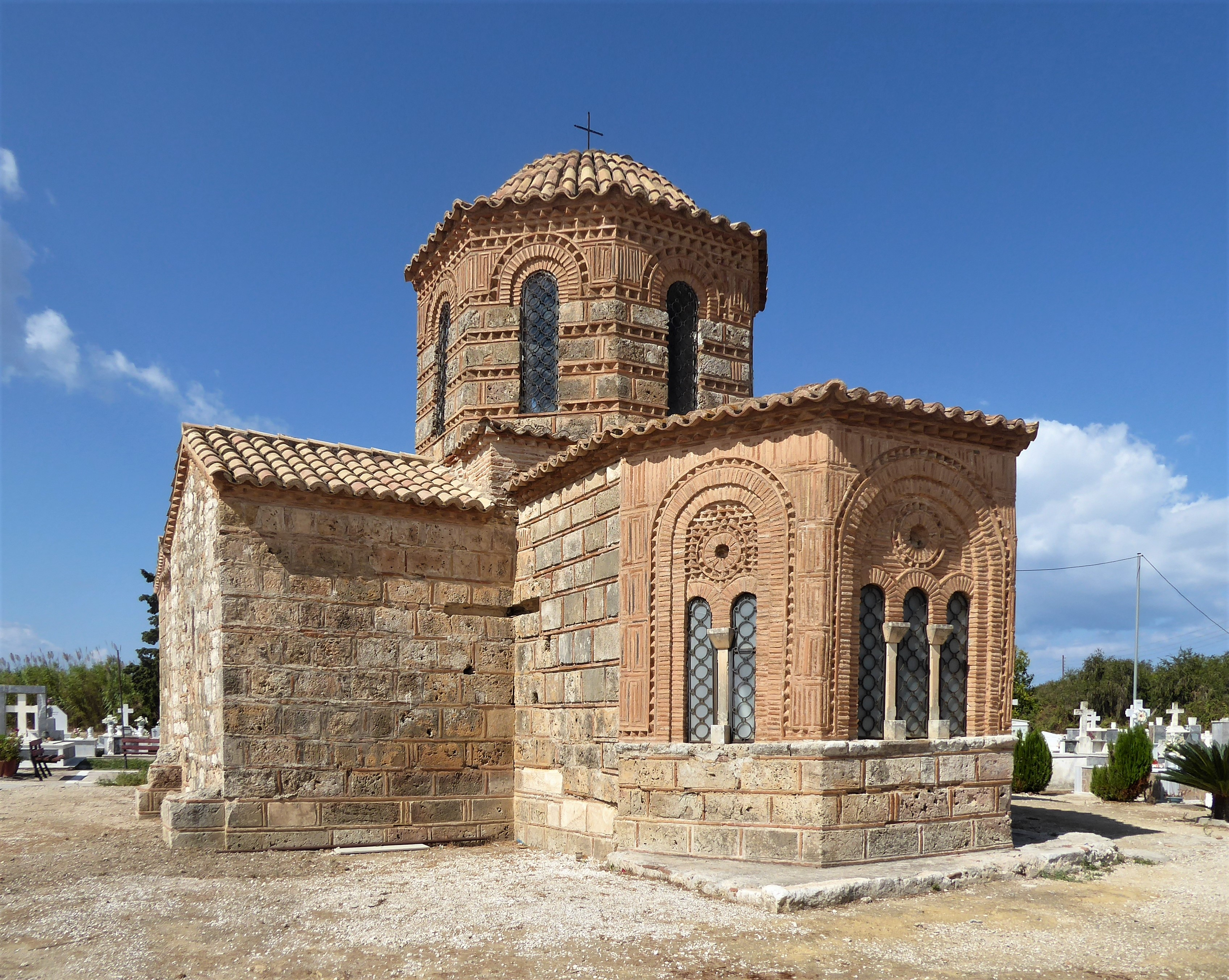
- Byzantine Church of the Palaiopanayia

- Location within Greece
- Coordinates: 38°03′N 21°21′E
- Country: Greece
- Administrative region: West Greece
- Regional unit: Elis
- Municipality: Andravida-Kyllini
- Municipal unit: Vouprasia

Population (2021)
  - Community: 1,448
- Time zone: UTC+2 (EET)
  - Summer (DST): UTC+3 (EEST)

Manolada (Greek: Μανολάδα) is a village and a community in the municipal unit of Vouprasia, Elis, Greece. It is situated in a vast, rural plain near the Ionian Sea, 2 km northwest of Varda, 3 km west of Nea Manolada and 40 km southwest of Patras. The community includes the small villages of Brinia, Karvounaiika, Loutra Yrminis, Mega Pefko and Samaraiika.

== History ==
The area was the site of the Battle of Manolada in 1316, a battle between the Franks and the Catalans over the hegemony over the Principality of Achaea.

=== 2013 shooting of migrant workers in strawberry fields ===
Manolada's economy is based on farming and is home to many strawberry fields. Many migrants work on these farms as Greeks are unwilling or unable to do this work. In 2013, after enduring years of unpaid wages and poor living conditions, an incident broke out on Nikos Vangelatos's farm where migrants protesting their conditions were shot and killed by the overseers. The Greek courts later acquitted the 3 overseers and the owner Nikos Vangelatos from all charges without explanation. The migrants were undocumented workers from Bangladesh and the perpetrators were ethnically Greek. The case is cited as an example of the hostile racism faced by minorities in the EU and Greece and the deception of migrant workers by Europeans.

== Population ==
| Year | Village population | Community population |
|---|---|---|
| 1981 | 1,160 | - |
| 1991 | 1,234 | - |
| 2001 | 1,522 | 1,835 |
| 2011 | 844 | 1,184 |
| 2021 | 1,202 | 1,448 |

== See also ==
- List of settlements in Elis
