= Myrsini =

Myrsini Μυρσίνη
- Community
- Location within Greece
- Coordinates: 37°55′N 21°14′E
- Country: Greece
- Administrative region: West Greece
- Regional unit: Elis
- Municipality: Andravida-Kyllini
- Municipal unit: Lechaina

Population (2021)
  - Community: 1,265
- Time zone: UTC+2 (EET)
  - Summer (DST): UTC+3 (EEST)

Myrsini (Greek: Μυρσίνη, before 1915: Σουλεϊμάναγα - Souleimanaga) is a town in Elis, Greece. It is part of the municipal unit of Lechaina since 1997. Myrsini lies in a flat coastal plain that stretches from Amaliada to Kato Achaia. It is 3 km southwest of Lechaina and 3 km northwest of Andravida.

== History ==
Myrsini is named after the ancient city of Myrsinos or Myrtountion (named in Homer's Iliad and in Strabo's Geographica V), which was located in the area. According to Homer, Myrsinos took part in the Trojan War together with all of the Eleans (Iliad II.616). During the Byzantine Empire, a village named Agios Nikolaos (St Nicholas) was located in the area. Only part of its church altar survives today. In the 16th century, the inhabitants moved further inland to escape corsair raids and founded the present village. During the Ottoman era, the village was named Suleymanaga (Σουλεϊμάναγα), after a local Ottoman governor named Suleyman Agha.

Along with the rest of the Peloponnese, the village was conquered in 1685 by the Republic of Venice during the Morean War, but was recovered by the Ottomans in 1715. It became a part of Greece after the Greek War of Independence, and was renamed to its present name in 1915.

== Population ==
Year	Population
1700	51 (19 families)
1920	1,168
1928	1,288
1940	1,481
1951	1,496
1961	1,352
1971	1,180
1981	1,100
1991	1,160
2001	1,196
2011	1,135
2021	1,265

== Notable people ==
Notable residents of Myrsini include:

- Peter Katholos former footballer who played for Sydney Olympic F.C. and Athlitiki Enosi Larissa F.C.
