= Neapoli, Elis =

Neapoli Νεάπολη
- Community
- Location within Greece
- Coordinates: 38°01′N 21°25′E
- Country: Greece
- Administrative region: West Greece
- Regional unit: Elis
- Municipality: Andravida-Kyllini
- Municipal unit: Vouprasia
- Elevation: 70 m (230 ft)

Population (2021)
  - Community: 192
- Time zone: UTC+2 (EET)
  - Summer (DST): UTC+3 (EEST)

Neapoli (Greek: Νεάπολη) is a village in the municipal unit of Vouprasia, Elis, Greece. It is located in the low hills west of the Movri hills, 5 km southeast of Varda, 4 km north of Nisi, 5 km west of Mataragka and 39 km north of Pyrgos.

== Population ==
Year	Population
1981	303
1991	391
2001	414
2011	153
2021	192

== See also ==
- List of settlements in Elis
