= San Teodoro =

San Teodoro may refer to:

== Italy ==
- San Teodoro (Genoa), a neighborhood
- San Teodoro, Sicily, a comune in the Metropolitan City of Messina
- San Teodoro, Sardinia, a comune in the Province of Olbia-Tempio
- San Teodoro, Rome, a 6th-century church
- San Teodoro, Pavia, a medieval church

== Philippines ==
- San Teodoro, Oriental Mindoro, a municipality
- San Teodoro, a barangay of Bunawan, Agusan del Sur

== See also ==
- Saint Theodore (disambiguation)
