= Aetorrachi, Elis =

Aetorrachi Αετορράχη
- Community
- Location within Greece
- Coordinates: 37°56′N 21°28′E
- Country: Greece
- Administrative region: West Greece
- Regional unit: Elis
- Municipality: Andravida-Kyllini
- Municipal unit: Vouprasia

Population (2021)
  - Community: 196
- Time zone: UTC+2 (EET)
  - Summer (DST): UTC+3 (EEST)

Aetorrachi (Greek: Αετορράχη, before 1957: Βάλακα - Valaka) is a settlement and a community in the municipal unit of Vouprasia, Elis Greece. It is located in the hills of northern Elis, 3 km east of Borsi, 14 km southeast of Varda and 30 km north of Pyrgos. It is close to the northern shore of the Pineios reservoir, and south of the Movri hills. The community includes the village Dafni.

== History ==
The village was founded during the Ottoman Era and was known as Valaka (Greek: Βάλακα), named after the Turkish chief Valak Agaş. After the Greek War of Independence of 1821, the Ottoman rule came to an end, and the Turks fled the area.

Aetorrachi became a community, together with the neighboring village of Kompothekra (which was renamed to Dafni in 1955). Aetorrachi was renamed in 1957 to Aetorrachi. In 1997, under the Kapodistrias Law, the area became a municipal district of the municipality of Vouprasia.

== Population ==
Year	Village population	Community population
1991	-	359
2001	122	288
2011	92	224
2021	97	196

== See also ==
- List of settlements in Elis
