= Arete (disambiguation) =

Arete (Greek: Ἀρετή) is a term meaning "virtue" or "excellence".

Arete, Arête, or Areté may also refer to:

== History ==
- Arete of Cyrene, a 4th-century BC Greek philosopher
- Arete (daughter of Dionysius), daughter of Dionysius I of Syracuse and wife of Dion (tyrant of Syracuse)

== Mythology ==
- Queen Arete (mythology), a character in Homer's Odyssey

== Science ==
- 197 Arete, an asteroid
- Arete, a genus of snapping shrimps in family Alpheidae

== Geography ==
- Arête, a thin ridge of rock formed by glaciers
- Arête, in climbing, an outward-facing corner between two steep faces

== Art ==
- Areté, an arts magazine

== Fiction ==
- Princess Arete, a 2001 animated Japanese film and its title character

== Locations ==
- The Areté, the fine arts centre of the Ateneo de Manila University

Placenames normally transliterated Areti

- Areti, Cyclades, a village on the island of Milos, Cyclades
- Areti, Elis, a village in Elis
- Areti, Ioannina, a village in the Ioannina regional unit
- Areti, Thessaloniki, a village in the Thessaloniki regional unit

== See also ==
- Aretes (Greek: Ἀρέτης), Macedonian General
