= Pente Vryses =

Village in Central Macedonia, Greece

Pente Vryses Πέντε Βρύσες
- Settlement
- Location within Greece
- Coordinates: 40°48.5′N 23°9.3′E
- Country: Greece
- Administrative region: Central Macedonia
- Regional unit: Thessaloniki
- Municipality: Lagkadas
- Municipal unit: Vertiskos
- Community: Exalofos
- Elevation: 420 m (1,380 ft)

Population (2021)
  - Total: 302
- Time zone: UTC+2 (EET)
  - Summer (DST): UTC+3 (EEST)
- Postal code: 572 00
- Area code: +30-2394
- Vehicle registration: NA to NX

Pente Vryses (Greek: Πέντε Βρύσες, before 1926: Χατζή Μαχαλέ Chatzi Machale) is a village in the municipality of Lagkadas in Central Macedonia, Greece. Before the 2011 local government reform it was part of the municipality of Vertiskos. The 2021 census recorded 302 inhabitants in the village. Pente Vryses is a part of the community of Exalofos.

== History ==
Pente Vryses was ceded to Greece from the Ottoman Empire in 1913 after the Treaty of Bucharest that ended the Balkan Wars. It was then known as Chatzi Machale (Greek: Χατζή Μαχαλέ) and it was a Turkish village. After the population exchange between Greece and Turkey in 1923, its Turkish inhabitants were transferred to Turkey and 131 Pontic Greeks from the village of Zimera (Greek: Τσιμερά, later renamed Atalar) near Trebizond settled there. In 1926, Chatzi Machale was renamed to Pente Vryses. After the Axis occupation of Greece in World War II and the following Greek Civil War, many Aromanians from the village of Megala Livadia in the Kilkis regional unit also moved into Pente Vryses.

== See also ==
- List of settlements in the Thessaloniki regional unit
