= Melissa, Elis =

Melissa Μέλισσα
- Community
- Location within Greece
- Coordinates: 37°57′N 21°22′E
- Country: Greece
- Administrative region: West Greece
- Regional unit: Elis
- Municipality: Andravida-Kyllini
- Municipal unit: Lechaina

Population (2021)
  - Community: 211
- Time zone: UTC+2 (EET)
  - Summer (DST): UTC+3 (EEST)
- Area code: 26230

Melissa (Greek: Μέλισσα meaning "bee", before 1957: Καστράκι - Kastraki) is a village in the municipal unit of Lechaina in Elis, Greece. Its elevation is 100 m. The village is situated on a low hill, 10 km east of Lechaina proper, on the road to Borsi. The village has a school and a church named Agios Tryphonas.

== Historical population ==
Year	Population
1981	595
1991	224
2001	328
2011	301
2021	211

== See also ==
- List of settlements in Elis
