= Polydendri, Thessaloniki =

Village in Central Macedonia, Greece

Polydendri Πολυδένδρι
- Settlement
- Location within Greece
- Coordinates: 40°49′N 23°7′E
- Country: Greece
- Administrative region: Central Macedonia
- Regional unit: Thessaloniki
- Municipality: Lagkadas
- Municipal unit: Vertiskos
- Community: Exalofos
- Elevation: 380 m (1,250 ft)

Population (2021)
  - Total: 271
- Time zone: UTC+2 (EET)
  - Summer (DST): UTC+3 (EEST)
- Postal code: 572 00
- Area code: +30-2394
- Vehicle registration: NA to NX

Polydendri (Greek: Πολυδένδρι) is a village of the Lagkadas municipality. Before the 2011 local government reform it was part of the municipality of Vertiskos. The 2021 census recorded 271 inhabitants in the village. Polydendri is a part of the community of Exalofos.

== See also ==
- List of settlements in the Thessaloniki regional unit
