= Agios Panteleimonas =

Agios Panteleimonas (Greek for "Saint Pantaleon") may refer to the following places in Greece:

- Agios Panteleimonas, Athens, a central neighbourhood of Athens
- Agios Panteleimonas, Florina, a community in the municipality of Amyntaio, Florina regional unit
- Agios Panteleimonas, Elis, a village in the municipality Andravida-Kyllini, Elis regional unit
