= Agios Panteleimonas, Elis =

Agios Panteleimonas Άγιος Παντελεήμωνας
- Settlement
- Location within Greece
- Coordinates: 37°58′N 21°15′E
- Country: Greece
- Administrative region: West Greece
- Regional unit: Elis
- Municipality: Andravida-Kyllini
- Municipal unit: Lechaina
- Community: Lechaina

Population (2021)
  - Total: 66
- Time zone: UTC+2 (EET)
  - Summer (DST): UTC+3 (EEST)

Agios Panteleimonas (Greek: Άγιος Παντελεήμωνας) is a small coastal settlement in the community of Lechaina, Greece. It is 4 km northwest of Lechaina proper. There are two churches, Agios Panteleimonas and Agios Athanasios. It has a small port. The settlement was founded in the 1930s.

== Data ==
Year	Population
1991	53
2001	69
2011	37
2021	66

== See also ==
- List of settlements in Elis
