= Saint Theodora =

Saint Theodora may refer to:

- Theodora (Roman martyr) (died 120), 2nd-century Christian martyr and saint
- Theodora and Didymus (died 304), early Christian martyrs
- Theodora of Alexandria (5th century), Eastern Orthodox saint
- Theodora (wife of Justinian I) (500–548), 6th century Byzantine (Eastern Roman) empress, wife of Justinian I, considered a saint by the Greek Orthodox Church
- Theodora (wife of Theophilos) (born 815), Byzantine (Eastern Roman) empress in the 9th century
- Theodora of Thessalonica (886?), Eastern Orthodox saint commemorated on April 5
- Theodora of Thessaloniki (812–892), Eastern Orthodox saint commemorated on August 29
- Theodora (10th century), servant of Basil the Younger
- Theodora of Vasta (11th century?), Greek Orthodox saint
- Theodora of Arta (са. 1225 - after 1270) 13th century, Empress of Epirus
- Theodora of Sihla (1650–?), Romanian Orthodox saint
- Théodore Guérin (1798–1856), French-American saint, founder of the Sisters of Providence of Saint Mary-of-the-Woods, Indiana

== See also ==
- Saint Theodore (disambiguation)
- Theodora (disambiguation)
