= Chorouda =

Chorouda Χωρούδα
- Settlement
- Location within Greece
- Coordinates: 40°53.3′N 23°15.4′E
- Country: Greece
- Administrative region: Central Macedonia
- Regional unit: Thessaloniki
- Municipality: Langadas
- Municipal unit: Vertiskos
- Community: Vertiskos
- Elevation: 660 m (2,170 ft)

Population (2021)
  - Total: 27
- Time zone: UTC+2 (EET)
  - Summer (DST): UTC+3 (EEST)
- Postal code: 570 17
- Area code: +30-23694
- Vehicle registration: NA to NX

Chorouda (Greek: Χωρούδα, [xo'ɾuða]) is a village of the Lagkadas municipality. Before the 2011 local government reform it was a part of the municipality of Vertiskos. The 2021 census recorded 27 people in the village. Chorouda is a part of the local community of Vertiskos.

== See also ==
- List of settlements in the Thessaloniki regional unit
