= Andreas Karkavitsas =

Greek writer

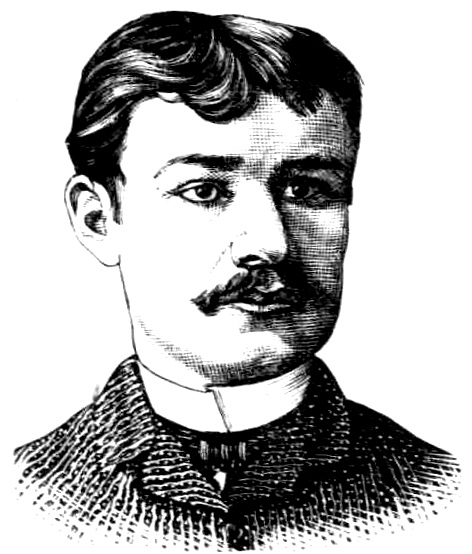
Andreas Karkavitsas.

Andreas Karkavitsas or Carcavitsas (Greek: Ανδρέας Καρκαβίτσας; Lechaina, 1866 – Marousi, October 10, 1922) was a Greek novelist. He was a naturalist, like Alexandros Papadiamantis.

== Biography ==
He was born in 1866 in the north-west Peloponnese, in the town of Lechaina in Elis. He studied medicine. As an army doctor, he travelled across a great range of villages and settlements, from which he recorded traditions and legends. He died on October 10, 1922, of laryngeal cancer. Several streets in Greece have been named after him, for instance in Pyrgos.

== Selected writings ==
Year	Title	English meaning	Published in
1892	Διηγήματα (Diiyimata)	Stories	Athens
1896	Η Λυγερή (I Liyeri)	The willowy girl	Athens
1897	Θεσσαλικές εικόνες. Ο ζητιάνος (Thessalikes eikones. O zitianos)	Thessalian images. The beggar	Athens
1899	Λόγια της πλώρης. θαλασσινά διηγήματα (Logia tis ploris. Thalassina diiyimata)	Words from the prow. Sea stories	Athens
1900	Παλιές αγάπες 1885-1897 (Palies agapes)	Old loves 1885-1897	Athens
1904	Ο αρχαιολόγος (O arheologos)	The archeologist	Athens
1922	Διηγήματα του γυλιού(Diiyimata tou yiliou)	Stories from the backpack	Athens
1922	Διηγήματα για τα παληκάρια μας (Diiyimata ya ta palikaria mas)	Stories about our lads	Athens

Karkavitsas wrote in the European tradition of naturalism (exemplified by Émile Zola), which does not shrink from portraying the seamier parts of life among humble people, rather than romanticising or embellishing reality. He was a folklorist with a gift for spinning tales full of authentic details of simple people's lives, local customs, dialects and folktales, as well as psychological insights about them. He was more successful as a short-story and novella writer. "The Beggar" is a novella about con-men, violence and the grotesque practices of professional beggars (including purposely maiming children to turn them into profitable objects of pity). "Words from the prow" is about the lives of seafarers, fishermen and sponge-divers, full of arcane details of their craft as well as folk-tale-inflected plots of tragedy, shipwreck, hands lost at sea, murder, superstition and the supernatural, as well as the joys of making a living off the sea.

== Translations ==
- The Beggar, tr. W. F. Wyatt (1982)
- The Archeologist and Selected Sea Stories, tr. Johanna Hanink (2021)
