= Exalofos =

Exalofos Εξάλοφος
- Community
- Location within Greece
- Coordinates: 40°48.5′N 23°9.3′E
- Country: Greece
- Administrative region: Central Macedonia
- Regional unit: Thessaloniki
- Municipality: Lagkadas
- Municipal unit: Vertiskos

Area
  - Community: 38.097 km^{2} (14.709 sq mi)
- Elevation: 410 m (1,350 ft)

Population (2021)
  - Community: 573
  - Density: 15.0/km^{2} (39.0/sq mi)
- Time zone: UTC+2 (EET)
  - Summer (DST): UTC+3 (EEST)
- Postal code: 572 00
- Area code: +30-2394
- Vehicle registration: NA to NX

Exalofos (Greek: Εξάλοφος) is a community of the Lagkadas municipality. Before the 2011 local government reform it was part of the municipality of Vertiskos, of which it was a municipal district. The 2021 census recorded 573 residents in the community. The community of Exalofos covers an area of 38.097 km^{2}.

== Administrative division ==
The community of Exalofos consists of two separate settlements (2021 populations):

- Pente Vryses (population 302)
- Polydendri (population 271)

== See also ==
- List of settlements in the Thessaloniki regional unit
