= Saint Theodore =

Saint Theodore may refer to:

== People ==
- St. Theodore (died 130), companion of St. Pausilippus
- St. Theodore of Perge (died 220), see Theodore, Philippa and companions
- St. Theodore the Martyr
  - St. Theodore of Amasea or St. Theodore Tyron (died 306), military saint
  - St. Theodore of Heraclea or St. Theodore Stratelates (281–319), military saint
- St. Theodore, Bishop of Cyrene in Libya (died 310), hieromartyr, feast day July 4
- St. Theodorus of Tabennese (c. 314–368), disciple of Saint Pachomius
- St. Theodore Trichinas (died 400), feast day April 20
- Mar Theodore of Mopsuestia (c. 350–428), Christian theologian, and Bishop of Mopsuestia
- St. Theodore of Octodurum or St. Yoder (4th century), bishop of Octodurum
- St. Theodore of Vienne (died c. 575), Christian monk, abbot and hermit
- St. Theodore of Marseille (died 594), persecuted bishop
- St. Theodore of Sykeon (died 613), Byzantine ascetic
- Pope St. Theodore I of Rome (died 649)
- St. Theodore of Tarsus (602–690), archbishop of Canterbury
- St. Theodore of Pavia (died 778), bishop
- St. Theodore (died 820), Orthodox monk
- St. Theodore the Studite (759–826), monk, opponent of iconoclasm, and hymnographer
- St. Theodorus the Branded, (ca. 775–ca. 842), see Theodorus and Theophanes
- St. Theodore the Great Ascetic, Bishop of Edessa (died 848), feast day July 9
- St. Theodore of the Kiev Caves (died 1098), monk-martyr, feast day August 11
- St. Theodore the Black of Smolensk (13th century)
- St. Theodore the Fool-for-Christ of Novgorod (died 1392), feast day January 19
- St. Feodor Ostrogski, (1360–1446)
- St. Theodore of Vršac (died 1594)
- St. Theodore of Komogovo (died 1788), Serbian Orthodox saint
- St. Théodore Guérin (1798–1856), French nun who died in Indiana
- St. Theodore Gusev (died 1940), new martyr, feast day January 19

== Places ==
- Theotokos of St. Theodore, an icon named after Theodore Stratelates
- Saint-Théodore-d'Acton, Quebec, a small parish in Acton Regional County Municipality, Quebec, Canada

== See also ==
- Agioi Theodoroi (disambiguation)
- Saint Theodora (disambiguation)
- San Teodoro (disambiguation)
- Teodor
- Theodore (disambiguation)
- Theodore (name)
