= Areti, Thessaloniki =

Areti Αρετή
- Settlement
- Location within Greece
- Coordinates: 40°45.4′N 23°15.2′E
- Country: Greece
- Administrative region: Central Macedonia
- Regional unit: Thessaloniki
- Municipality: Lagkadas
- Municipal unit: Vertiskos
- Community: Lofiskos
- Elevation: 420 m (1,380 ft)

Population (2021)
  - Total: 112
- Time zone: UTC+2 (EET)
  - Summer (DST): UTC+3 (EEST)
- Postal code: 570 02
- Area code: +30-2395
- Vehicle registration: NA to NX

Areti (Greek: Αρετή, [aɾe'ti]) is a village of the Lagkadas municipality. Before the 2011 local government reform it was part of the municipality of Vertiskos. The 2021 census recorded 112 inhabitants in the village. Areti is a part of the community of Lofiskos.

== See also ==
- List of settlements in the Thessaloniki regional unit
