= Ossa, Thessaloniki =

Village in Central Macedonia, Greece

Ossa Όσσα
- Community
- Location within Greece
- Coordinates: 40°50.2′N 23°12.3′E
- Country: Greece
- Administrative region: Central Macedonia
- Regional unit: Thessaloniki
- Municipality: Lagkadas
- Municipal unit: Vertiskos

Area
  - Community: 59.12 km^{2} (22.83 sq mi)
- Elevation: 627 m (2,057 ft)

Population (2021)
  - Community: 486
  - Density: 8.22/km^{2} (21.3/sq mi)
- Time zone: UTC+2 (EET)
  - Summer (DST): UTC+3 (EEST)
- Postal code: 572 00
- Area code: +30-2394
- Vehicle registration: NA to NX

Ossa (Greek: Όσσα, Bulgarian: Висока), known before 1926 as Vissoka (Βυσσώκα), is a village and a community of the Lagkadas municipality, in Central Macedonia, Greece. After the 2011 local government reform it became part of the municipality of Vertiskos, of which is a municipal district of the general Lagkadas area. The 2021 census recorded 486 inhabitants in the community of Ossa. The community of Ossa covers an area of 59.12 km^{2}.

The village's older name (Vyssoka or Vyrsoka) from the word "vyrso" which in greek means leather and hence, "Vyssoka" or "Vyrsoka" is the place where the "people work with leather" (βυρσοδέψες) as the majority of the inhabitants used to be leather cobblers. Hence, the name became "Vyssoka" (Βυσσώκα) - meaning the place that has leather cobblers. Ossa is an ancient name found in documents,maps, up to 1600/1700 and after 1926. Ossa used to be an ancient Greek city in the region (3 BC, 4BC).

There used to be since aprox. 1700s two very popular Greek schools in Ossa, one for girls and one for boys that attracted children from the other villages. It is remarkable that due to the Greek civilisation and culture in the area, were allowed to open schools by the Otomman Empire.

The village has a very popular saint, Agia Kyranna (Αγία Κυράννα) who is celebrated on the 8th of January.

Due to the Otomman Empire, along with the Greeks, Bulgarians lived there and there were some icons at the church in Slavic.

In 1997, the Greek newspaper Eleftherotypia reported that the icons of the local church in Ossa which were transcribed in Slavic were kept in a separate, safe place.

== Administrative division ==
The community of Ossa consists of two separate settlements:

- Galini (population 77 in 2021)
- Ossa (population 409)

== Notable people born in Ossa ==
- Kyranna of Thessaloniki, an Orthodox Christian saint
- Ivan Angelov - 19th century Bulgarian Exarchate priest and leader of the Bulgarian community of Thessaloniki
- Zapryan Stoyanov - Soldier in the Macedonian-Adrianopolitan Volunteer Corps

== See also ==
- List of settlements in the Thessaloniki regional unit
