= Nea Manolada =

Nea Manolada Νέα Μανολάδα
- Community
- Location within Greece
- Coordinates: 38°03′N 21°23′E
- Country: Greece
- Administrative region: West Greece
- Regional unit: Elis
- Municipality: Andravida-Kyllini
- Municipal unit: Vouprasia
- Elevation: 15 m (49 ft)

Population (2021)
  - Community: 3,696
- Time zone: UTC+2 (EET)
  - Summer (DST): UTC+3 (EEST)
- Postal code: 270 52
- Area code: 26230

Nea Manolada (Greek: Νέα Μανολάδα) is a community in the municipal unit of Vouprasia, Elis, southwestern Greece. It is located in a vast, rural plain, It is 3 km southwest of Neo Vouprasio, 3 km northeast of Varda and 37 km southwest of Patras. The Greek National Road 9 (Patras - Pyrgos) passes east of the village, and the railway Patras - Pyrgos runs through the village. In 2001, a train derailment occurred in Nea Manolada injuring two passengers as a train was heading from Athens to Kyparissia.

Year	Population
1981	1,235
1991	1,449
2001	1,973
2011	2,006
2021	3,696

== See also ==
- List of settlements in Elis
