= Vouprasia =

Vouprasia Βουπρασία
- Municipal unit
- Location within the regional unit

- Location within Greece
- Coordinates: 38°2′N 21°22′E
- Country: Greece
- Administrative region: West Greece
- Regional unit: Elis
- Municipality: Andravida-Kyllini

Area
  - Municipal unit: 170.9 km^{2} (66.0 sq mi)
- Elevation: 37 m (121 ft)

Population (2021)
  - Municipal unit: 10,617
  - Municipal unit density: 62.12/km^{2} (160.9/sq mi)
- Time zone: UTC+2 (EET)
  - Summer (DST): UTC+3 (EEST)
- Postal code: 270 52
- Area code: 26230
- Vehicle registration: ΗΑ

Vouprasia (Greek: Βουπρασία) is a former municipality in Elis, West Greece, Greece. Since the 2011 local government reform it is part of the municipality Andravida-Kyllini, of which it is a municipal unit. Its seat of administration was Varda. The municipal unit has about 10,600 inhabitants. The area of the municipal unit is 170.859 km^{2}.

== Geography ==
Vouprasia is located in northern Elis, on the Ionian coast between Patras and Pyrgos. The Greek National Road 9/E55 and the Patras-Kalamata railway line pass through it. Vouprasia has one disused railway station, in Varda.

The area is mostly flat, and the main land use is agriculture. The lagoon Kotychi, connected with the Ionian Sea, is located in the western part of Vouprasia. There is a health center in Varda.

Vouprasia borders on (clockwise from the west) the Ionian Sea, the municipal units Larissos and Olenia (both Achaea) and the municipal units Pineia, Amaliada and Lechaina (both Elis).

== Subdivisions ==
The municipal unit Vouprasia is subdivided into the following communities:

Community	Settlements within community	Population (2021)
Varda	Varda, Kougaiika, Komi, Sympanio, Psari	3,687
Aetorrachi	Aetorrachi, Dafni	196
Kapeleto	Kapeleto, Thanasoulaiika	476
Kourtesi	Kourtesi, Ano Kourtesi, Kotteika	554
Manolada	Manolada, Karvounaiika, Loutra Yrminis, Brinia, Samaraiika	1,448
Nea Manolada	Nea Manolada	3,696
Neapoli	Neapoli	192
Nisi	Nisi, Agia Marina, Agios Athanasios, Karavoulaiika, Kremmydi	308
Xenies	Xenies, Kalyvakia, Palaiochora	60

== Population history ==
Year	Population
1991	9,664
2001	11,204
2011	8,388
2021	10,617
