= Kyranna of Thessaloniki =

Orthodox Christian saint and new martyr

Saint Kyranna of Thessaloniki Κυράννα
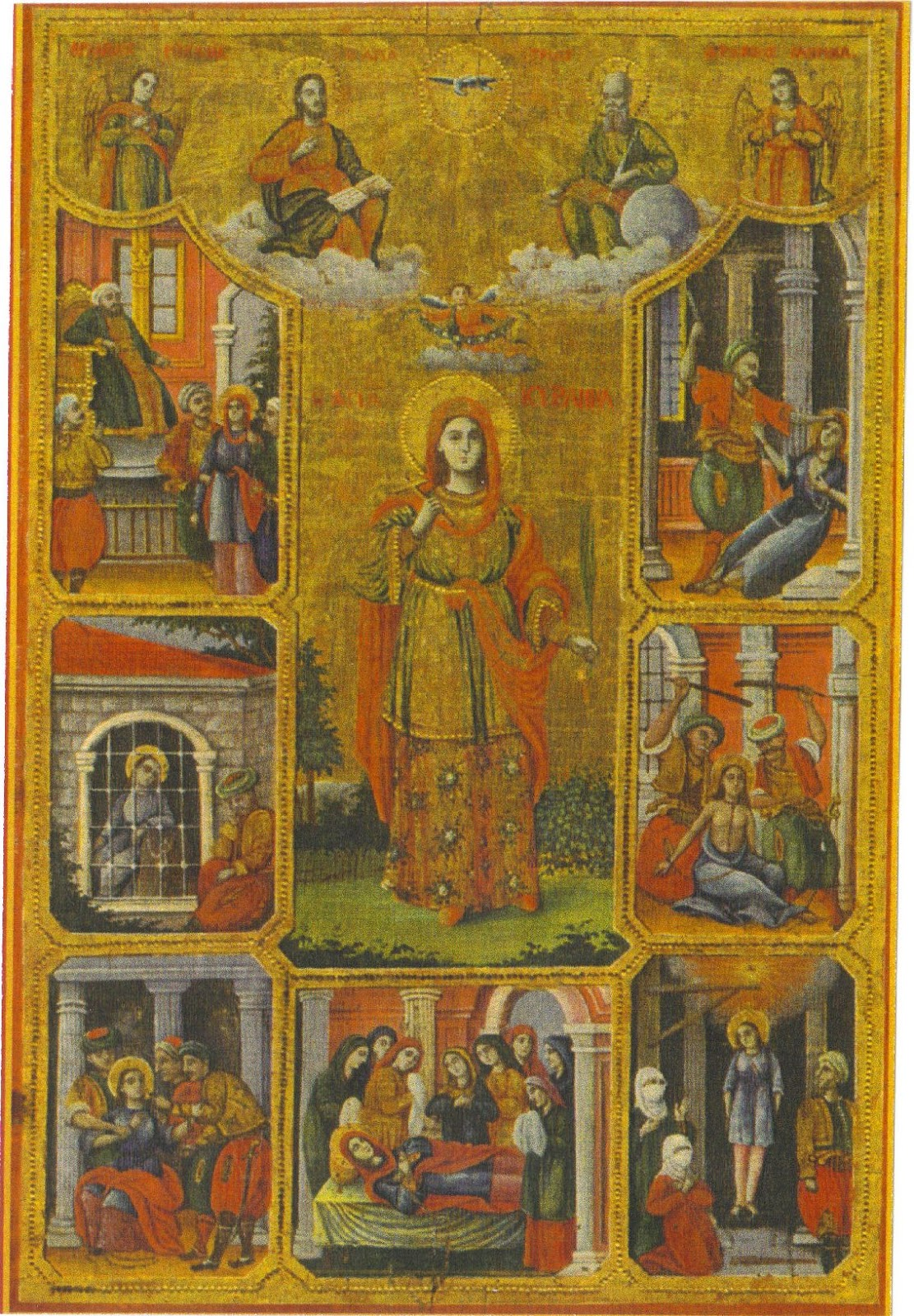
- 19th century icon of Saint Kyranna.

New Martyr
- Born: 1731; Ossa, Ottoman Empire
- Venerated in: Eastern Orthodox Church
- Feast: 28 February

Kyranna of Thessaloniki (Greek: Κυράννα; 1731-1751) is an Orthodox Christian saint and new martyr. Her feast day is on 28 February. She was allegedly killed by an Ottoman official, who unsuccessfully attempted to marry her and force her to convert to Islam.

She was born in 1731 in Ossa near Thessaloniki in Ottoman Macedonia.

She was buried somewhere outside the walls of Thessalonki. Her life was recorded by St. Nikodemos the Hagiorite in his New Martyrology. In 2011 some of her relics were discovered beneath floor slabs in the Church of the Archangels in Ossa.
