= Lofiskos, Thessaloniki =

Lofiskos Λοφίσκος
- Community
- Location within Greece
- Coordinates: 40°46.4′N 23°13.4′E
- Country: Greece
- Administrative region: Central Macedonia
- Regional unit: Thessaloniki
- Municipality: Lagkadas
- Municipal unit: Vertiskos

Area
  - Community: 52.767 km^{2} (20.373 sq mi)
- Elevation: 445 m (1,460 ft)

Population (2021)
  - Community: 306
  - Density: 5.80/km^{2} (15.0/sq mi)
- Time zone: UTC+2 (EET)
  - Summer (DST): UTC+3 (EEST)
- Postal code: 570 02
- Area code: +30-2395
- Vehicle registration: NA to NX

Lofiskos (Greek: Λοφίσκος) is a village and a community of the Lagkadas municipality. Before the 2011 local government reform it was part of the municipality of Vertiskos, of which it was a municipal district. The 2021 census recorded 306 inhabitants in the community of Lofiskos. The community of Lofiskos covers an area of 52.767 km^{2}.

== Administrative division ==
The community of Lofiskos consists of two separate settlements:

- Areti (population 112 in 2021)
- Lofiskos (population 194)

== See also ==
- List of settlements in the Thessaloniki regional unit
