= Agioi Theodoroi (disambiguation) =

Agioi Theodoroi (Greek: Άγιοι Θεοδώροι, "SS. Theodores) may refer:

== Places ==
- Agioi Theodoroi, a town in Corinthia, Greece
- Agioi Theodoroi, Elis, a settlement in Elis, Greece
- Agioi Theodoroi, Kozani, a settlement in Kozani regional unit, Greece
- Agioi Theodoroi, Methana, a settlement in the Methana peninsula, Greece
- Agioi Theodoroi Islands, two Islets near Platanias (Crete)
- Agioi Theodoroi (Zeytinliköy), the Greek name of a village in the Turkish island of Imbros.
- Agioi Theodoroi, a hill in the Gulf of Antikyra on which ancient Medeon (Phocis) stood

== Churches ==
- Hagioi Theodoroi, a church in Istanbul, Turkey
- Agii Theodori (Athens), a Byzantine church in Athens from the 11th century
- Agii Theodori (Mystras), a Byzantine Church at Mystras
- Agioi Theodoroi, a church placed on the hill named after it at the site of ancient Medeon (Phocis)
