= Borsi, Greece =

Borsi Μπόρσι
- Community
- Location within Greece
- Coordinates: 37°56′N 21°26′E
- Country: Greece
- Administrative region: West Greece
- Regional unit: Elis
- Municipality: Andravida-Kyllini
- Municipal unit: Lechaina
- Elevation: 170 m (560 ft)

Population (2021)
  - Community: 192
- Time zone: UTC+2 (EET)
  - Summer (DST): UTC+3 (EEST)
- Postal code: 270 52
- Area code: 26230

Borsi (Greek: Μπόρσι) is a hillside community in Elis, Greece. It is part of the municipal unit of Lechaina. It is situated near the Pineios reservoir, about 17 km east of Lechaina proper. Between 1841 and 1912, the community was part of the old municipality of Vouprasia. The nearest villages are Aetorrachi to the east and Kentro to the south.

== Population ==
Year	Population
1991	290
2001	381
2011	209
2021	192

== See also ==
- List of settlements in Elis
