= Varda, Greece =

Varda Βάρδα
- Community
- Location within Greece
- Coordinates: 38°2′N 21°22′E
- Country: Greece
- Administrative region: West Greece
- Regional unit: Elis
- Municipality: Andravida-Kyllini
- Municipal unit: Vouprasia

Population (2021)
  - Community: 3,687
- Time zone: UTC+2 (EET)
  - Summer (DST): UTC+3 (EEST)

Varda (Greek: Βάρδα) is a town and a community in the municipal unit of Vouprasia, Elis, Greece. It was the seat of the former municipality Vouprasia. The community Varda consists of the town Varda and the villages Kougaiika, Komi, Sympanio and Psari. Varda is situated in the plains near the Ionian Sea, and east of the Kotychi lagoon. It is 2 km southeast of Manolada, 3 km southwest of Nea Manolada, 14 km northeast of Lechaina and 40 km southwest of Patras. The railway from Patras to Pyrgos passes west of the town, and the Greek National Road 9 (Patras - Pyrgos) passes east of the town.

== Population ==
Year	Town population	Community population
1981	3,039	-
1991	2,625	-
2001	3,100	4,410
2011	2,291	3,070
2021	2,762	3,687

== Komi ==
The village Komi (Greek: Κώμη) is situated in a rural area at the foot of low hills, 2 km east of Varda town centre. Its population was 96 in 2021. Komi was one of the villages that was settled with Arvanites after the Black Death (1347–1350) had devastated much of Elis' population. The other villages were Basta, Kaloletsi and Milies. In the beginning of the 20th century, its inhabitants spoke both Greek and Arvanitika.

== Psari ==
The village Psari (Greek: Ψάρι meaning "fish") is situated at the foot of low hills, 2 km southeast of Varda town centre. Its population was 325 in 2021. Neapoli is 3 km to the east.

== See also ==
- List of settlements in Elis
