= Myrtuntium =

Town in the Elis region of ancient Greece

Myrtuntium or Myrtountion (Ancient Greek: Μυρτούντιον), called Myrsinus or Myrsinos (Μύρσινος) by Homer, was a town of ancient Elis. Homer mentions it among the towns of the Epeii in the Catalogue of Ships in the Iliad. Strabo describes Myrtunium as situated on the road from the city of Elis to Dyme in ancient Achaea, at the distance of 70 stadia from the former place and near the sea.

Myrtuntium is usually located on the eastern shore of the lagoon Kotiki, about 4 kilometres (2.5 mi) west of the town of Kapeleto, in an area that is supposed to have been adjacent to the sea in antiquity. Others, however, they consider this identification unlikely and believe that Homer's Myrsinus should not be identified with Strabo's Myrtunium, but with a Mycenaean fortress known as the Dymaean Wall located south of the cape of Araxus.
