= Kotychi =

Lagoon in Elis, Greece

Coordinates: 38.00°N 21.29°E

Designations

Ramsar Wetland
- Official name: Kotychi lagoons
- Designated: 21 August 1975
- Reference no.: 63

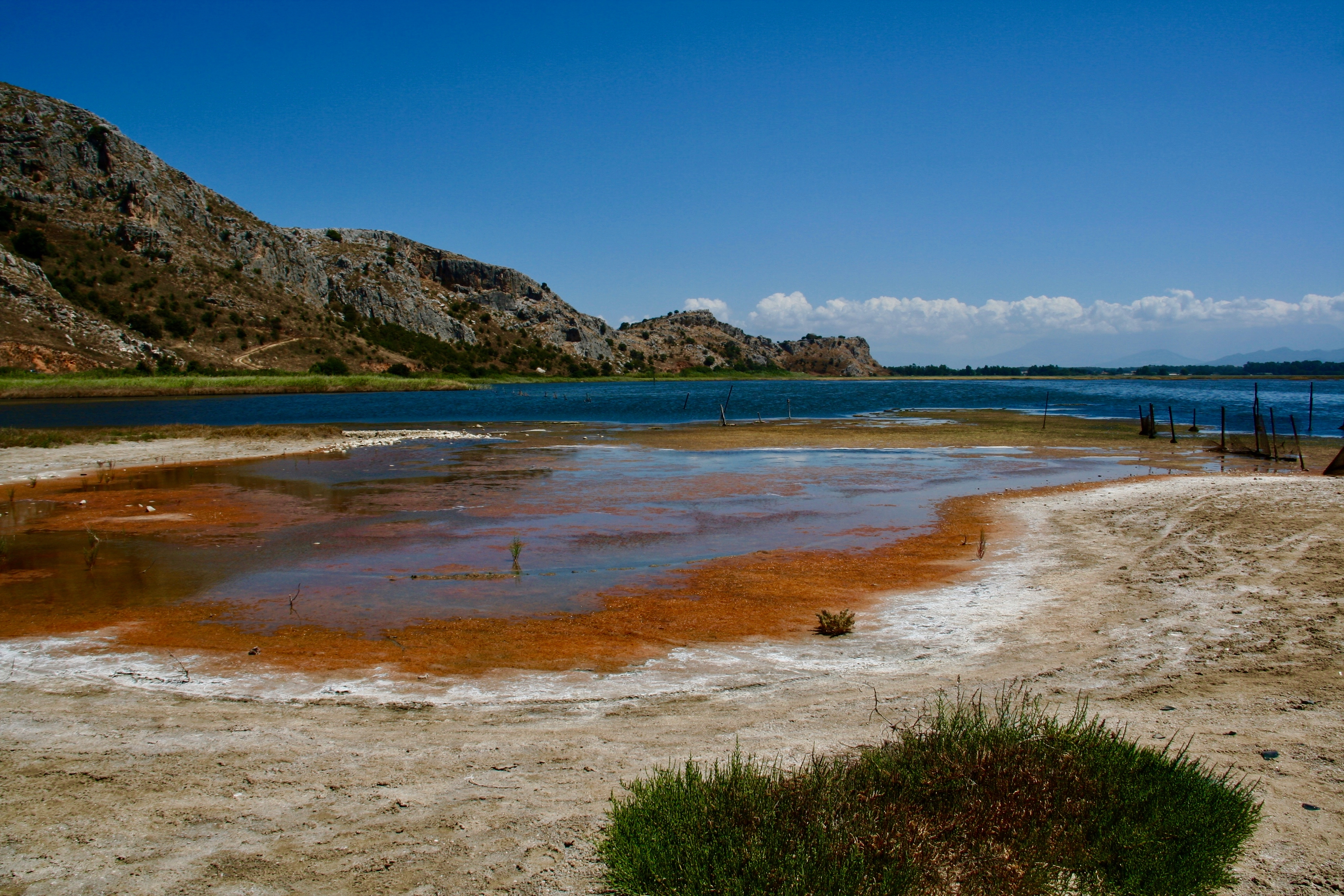
Kotychi on a clear day

Kotychi (Greek: Κοτύχι) is a lagoon in the northwestern part of Elis, Greece. It straddles the boundaries of the municipal units Lechaina and Vouprasia. It is located 23 km north of Amaliada and 45 km southwest of Patras. The lagoon is connected with the Ionian Sea. It is a protected wetland area, as recognized by the Ramsar Convention, The Kotychi lagoon is an important areas for waterbirds in Greece. Its surface area is 3.7 km².
