= Lechaina =

Town in Elis, Greece

Lechaina Λεχαινά
- Municipal unit
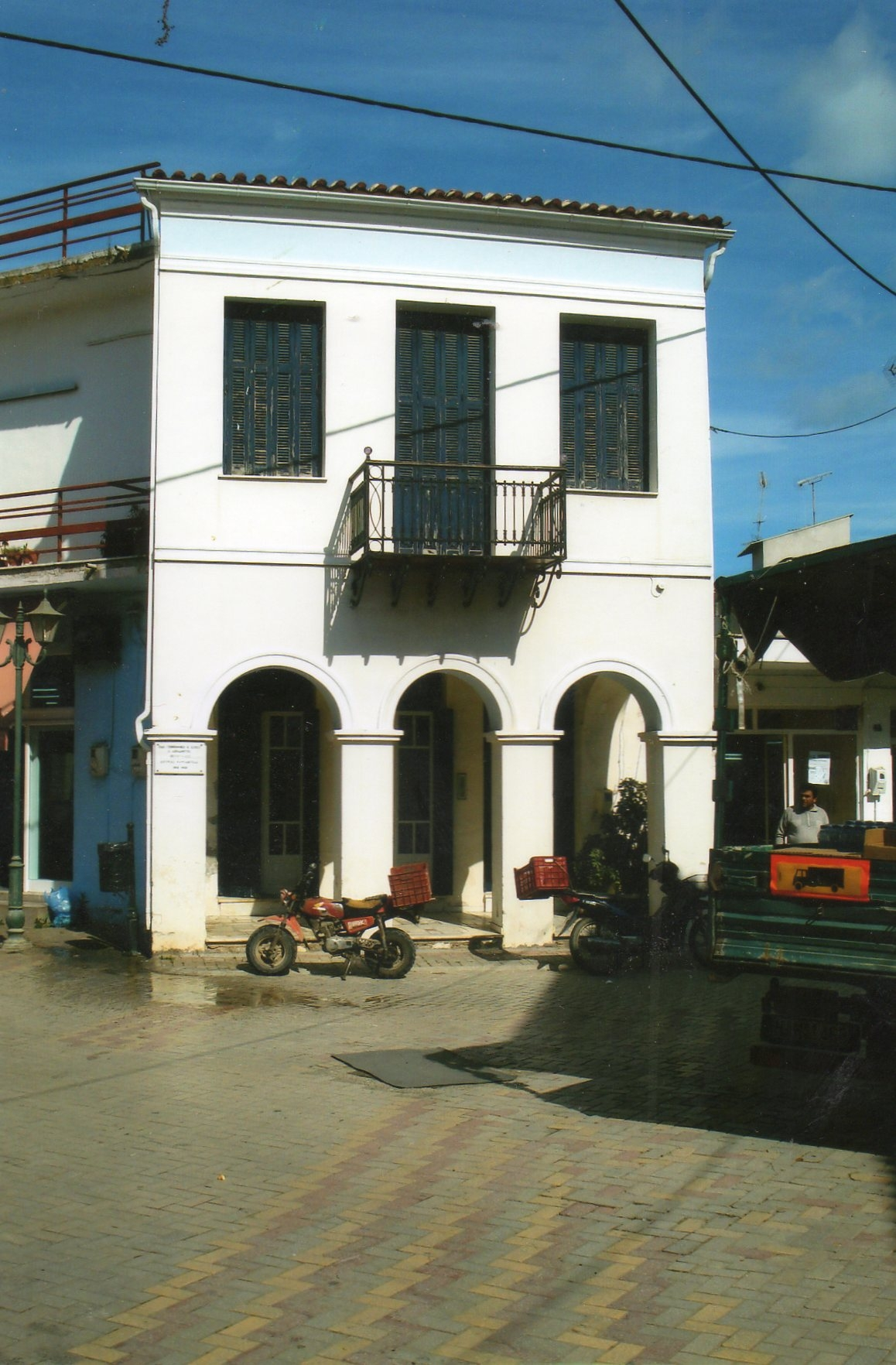
- House of Andreas Karkavitsas in Lechaina

- Location within the regional unit

- Location within Greece
- Coordinates: 37°56′N 21°16′E
- Country: Greece
- Geographic region: Peloponnese
- Administrative region: West Greece
- Regional unit: Elis
- Municipality: Andravida-Kyllini

Area
  - Municipal unit: 94.57 km^{2} (36.51 sq mi)
- Elevation: 5 m (16 ft)

Population (2021)
  - Municipal unit: 4,910
  - Municipal unit density: 51.9/km^{2} (134/sq mi)
  - Community: 2,993
- Time zone: UTC+2 (EET)
  - Summer (DST): UTC+3 (EEST)
- Postal code: 270 53
- Area code: 26230
- Vehicle registration: ΗΑ

Lechaina (Greek: Λεχαινά) is a town and a former municipality in Elis, Greece. Since the 2011 local government reform it is part of the municipality Andravida-Kyllini, of which it is the seat and a municipal unit. The municipal unit has an area of 94.567 km^{2}. It is situated 39 km north of the city of Pyrgos, and 60 km southwest of Patras.

== Geography ==
The area of the municipal unit Lechaina stretches from the flatlands on the Ionian Sea coast to the hills around the Pineios reservoir in the east. The main land use is agriculture. The lagoon Kotychi, connected with the Ionian Sea, is located in the northern part of Lechaina. Lechaina has a railway station on the line Patras-Kalamata. The principal streams are Andravida Creek and Melissos. The Greek National Road 9 Patras-Pylos runs through Lechaina.

=== Subdivisions ===
The municipal unit Lechaina is subdivided into the following communities (constituent villages in brackets):

Community	Population (2021 census)	Elevation (m)	Coordinates
Lechaina (incl. Agioi Theodoroi, Agios Panteleimonas and Katarrachi)	2,993	6	37.938°N 21.263°E
Agios Charalampos	47	120	37.941°N 21.402°E
Areti	202	5	37.975°N 21.303°E
Borsi	192	170	37.927°N 21.438°E
Melissa	211	90	37.950°N 21.373°E
Myrsini	1,265	10	37.922°N 21.237°E

== History ==
Mid 20th century, an irrigation project increased agricultural production of Lechaina. Forest fires have caused damage in Lechaina, especially in 1993 and 2001. The 2008 Peloponnese earthquake also caused damage in Lechaina.

== Population history ==
Year	Town population	Municipal unit population
1981	3,200	-
1991	3,137	5,625
2001	3,837	6,334
2011	2,641	4,855
2021	2,993	4,910

== Notable people ==
- Andreas Karkavitsas, writer

== See also ==
- List of settlements in Elis
