= Vertiskos =

Vertiskos Βερτίσκος
- Municipal unit
- Location within the regional unit

- Location within Greece
- Coordinates: 40°53′N 23°13.6′E
- Country: Greece
- Administrative region: Central Macedonia
- Regional unit: Thessaloniki
- Municipality: Lagkadas

Area
  - Municipal unit: 196.613 km^{2} (75.913 sq mi)
  - Community: 46.629 km^{2} (18.004 sq mi)
- Elevation: 740 m (2,430 ft)

Population (2021)
  - Municipal unit: 1,644
  - Municipal unit density: 8.362/km^{2} (21.66/sq mi)
  - Community: 279
  - Community density: 5.98/km^{2} (15.5/sq mi)
- Time zone: UTC+2 (EET)
  - Summer (DST): UTC+3 (EEST)
- Postal code: 570 17
- Area code: +30-23694
- Vehicle registration: NA to NX

Vertiskos (Greek: Βερτίσκος), known before 1927 as Berova (Μπέροβα), is a village a community and a former municipality in the Thessaloniki regional unit, Greece. Since the 2011 local government reform it is part of the municipality Lagkadas, of which it is a municipal unit. The 2021 census recorded 279 people in the community and 1,644 people in the municipal unit of Vertiskos. The community of Vertiskos covers an area of 46.629 km^{2} while the respective municipal unit covers an area of 196.613 km^{2}.

== Administrative division ==
The municipal unit of Vertiskos comprises four communities:

- Exalofos
- Lofiskos
- Ossa
- Vertiskos

The community of Vertiskos consists of two separate settlements:

- Chorouda
- Vertiskos

== Name and history ==
The name of the municipality Vertiskos came from the village Vertiskos, which means "The green" in Latin. The old name of Vertiskos was "Berva". The village Vertiskos was built in the end of the 1600. The people in Vertiskos speak Greek only, and they have retained some of their traditional customs. The village Vertiskos in the 1900s was a developed society. They had their own electricity and manufacturing. Vertiskos workers organized a trade union in the early 1900s which was unique among the Balkan region. This union together with other cultural organisations in Vertiskos organised cultural and political activities. After the civil war in Greece, the village disintegrated. Today Vertiskos has only about 100 permanent residents. The summer school for classical music which existed for many years is closed today and has been replaced by a series of seminars about the environment for students and teachers.

== See also ==
- List of settlements in the Thessaloniki regional unit
