= Andravida-Kyllini =

Andravida-Kyllini Ανδραβίδα-Κυλλήνη
- Municipality
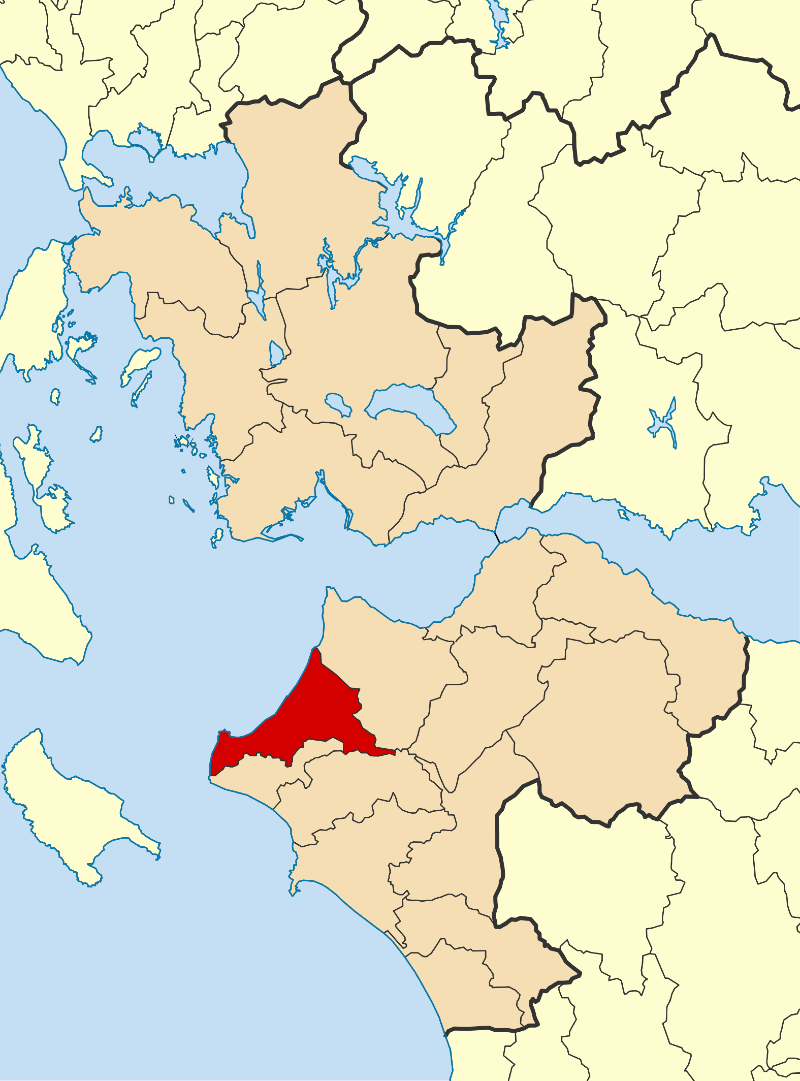

- Location within Greece
- Coordinates: 37°56′N 21°16′E
- Country: Greece
- Administrative region: West Greece
- Regional unit: Elis
- Seat: Lechaina

Area
  - Municipality: 355.5 km^{2} (137.3 sq mi)

Population (2021)
  - Municipality: 22,552
  - Density: 63.44/km^{2} (164.3/sq mi)
- Time zone: UTC+2 (EET)
  - Summer (DST): UTC+3 (EEST)

Andravida–Kyllini (Greek: Ανδραβίδα-Κυλλήνη) is a municipality in the Elis regional unit, West Greece region, Greece. The seat of the municipality is the town Lechaina. The municipality has an area of 355.476 km^{2}.

== Municipality ==
The municipality Andravida–Kyllini was formed at the 2011 local government reform by the merger of the following 4 former municipalities, that became municipal units:

- Andravida
- Kastro-Kyllini
- Lechaina
- Vouprasia
